

591001–591100 

|-bgcolor=#d6d6d6
| 591001 ||  || — || January 3, 2013 || Mount Lemmon || Mount Lemmon Survey ||  || align=right | 2.5 km || 
|-id=002 bgcolor=#fefefe
| 591002 ||  || — || January 10, 2013 || Haleakala || Pan-STARRS ||  || align=right data-sort-value="0.57" | 570 m || 
|-id=003 bgcolor=#d6d6d6
| 591003 ||  || — || January 10, 2013 || Haleakala || Pan-STARRS ||  || align=right | 2.1 km || 
|-id=004 bgcolor=#C2FFFF
| 591004 ||  || — || January 13, 2013 || Mount Lemmon || Mount Lemmon Survey || L4 || align=right | 8.0 km || 
|-id=005 bgcolor=#d6d6d6
| 591005 ||  || — || January 10, 2013 || Haleakala || Pan-STARRS ||  || align=right | 1.8 km || 
|-id=006 bgcolor=#C2FFFF
| 591006 ||  || — || January 5, 2013 || Mount Lemmon || Mount Lemmon Survey || L4 || align=right | 6.5 km || 
|-id=007 bgcolor=#C2FFFF
| 591007 ||  || — || January 14, 2013 || Mount Lemmon || Mount Lemmon Survey || L4 || align=right | 8.5 km || 
|-id=008 bgcolor=#C2FFFF
| 591008 ||  || — || January 10, 2013 || Haleakala || Pan-STARRS || L4 || align=right | 7.3 km || 
|-id=009 bgcolor=#d6d6d6
| 591009 ||  || — || January 10, 2013 || Haleakala || Pan-STARRS ||  || align=right | 2.3 km || 
|-id=010 bgcolor=#C2FFFF
| 591010 ||  || — || December 23, 2012 || Haleakala || Pan-STARRS || L4(8060) || align=right | 6.0 km || 
|-id=011 bgcolor=#C2FFFF
| 591011 ||  || — || March 24, 2003 || Kitt Peak || Spacewatch || L4 || align=right | 7.5 km || 
|-id=012 bgcolor=#C2FFFF
| 591012 ||  || — || September 27, 2012 || Haleakala || Pan-STARRS || L4 || align=right | 7.2 km || 
|-id=013 bgcolor=#C2FFFF
| 591013 ||  || — || February 11, 2002 || Socorro || LINEAR || L4 || align=right | 9.5 km || 
|-id=014 bgcolor=#E9E9E9
| 591014 ||  || — || March 8, 2005 || Anderson Mesa || LONEOS ||  || align=right | 1.2 km || 
|-id=015 bgcolor=#C2FFFF
| 591015 ||  || — || December 23, 2012 || Haleakala || Pan-STARRS || L4 || align=right | 7.0 km || 
|-id=016 bgcolor=#C2FFFF
| 591016 ||  || — || September 27, 2009 || Mount Lemmon || Mount Lemmon Survey || L4 || align=right | 6.9 km || 
|-id=017 bgcolor=#C2FFFF
| 591017 ||  || — || November 3, 2010 || Mount Lemmon || Mount Lemmon Survey || L4 || align=right | 6.6 km || 
|-id=018 bgcolor=#d6d6d6
| 591018 ||  || — || January 16, 2013 || Haleakala || Pan-STARRS ||  || align=right | 2.2 km || 
|-id=019 bgcolor=#C2FFFF
| 591019 ||  || — || October 13, 2010 || Mount Lemmon || Mount Lemmon Survey || L4 || align=right | 6.0 km || 
|-id=020 bgcolor=#C2FFFF
| 591020 ||  || — || February 13, 2002 || Apache Point || SDSS Collaboration || L4 || align=right | 8.5 km || 
|-id=021 bgcolor=#fefefe
| 591021 ||  || — || January 16, 2013 || Mount Lemmon SkyCe || A. Kostin, T. Vorobjov ||  || align=right data-sort-value="0.64" | 640 m || 
|-id=022 bgcolor=#d6d6d6
| 591022 ||  || — || February 9, 2008 || Mount Lemmon || Mount Lemmon Survey ||  || align=right | 2.3 km || 
|-id=023 bgcolor=#C2FFFF
| 591023 ||  || — || January 6, 2013 || Kitt Peak || Spacewatch || L4 || align=right | 7.2 km || 
|-id=024 bgcolor=#C2FFFF
| 591024 ||  || — || November 3, 2010 || Mount Lemmon || Mount Lemmon Survey || L4 || align=right | 9.0 km || 
|-id=025 bgcolor=#fefefe
| 591025 ||  || — || January 16, 2013 || Haleakala || Pan-STARRS ||  || align=right data-sort-value="0.56" | 560 m || 
|-id=026 bgcolor=#d6d6d6
| 591026 ||  || — || January 17, 2013 || Kitt Peak || Spacewatch ||  || align=right | 2.3 km || 
|-id=027 bgcolor=#fefefe
| 591027 ||  || — || August 23, 2011 || Haleakala || Pan-STARRS ||  || align=right data-sort-value="0.61" | 610 m || 
|-id=028 bgcolor=#C2FFFF
| 591028 ||  || — || January 17, 2013 || Haleakala || Pan-STARRS || L4 || align=right | 7.3 km || 
|-id=029 bgcolor=#C2FFFF
| 591029 ||  || — || September 27, 2012 || Haleakala || Pan-STARRS || L4(8060) || align=right | 7.4 km || 
|-id=030 bgcolor=#C2FFFF
| 591030 ||  || — || November 2, 2010 || Mount Lemmon || Mount Lemmon Survey || L4 || align=right | 6.1 km || 
|-id=031 bgcolor=#d6d6d6
| 591031 ||  || — || December 23, 2012 || Haleakala || Pan-STARRS ||  || align=right | 3.1 km || 
|-id=032 bgcolor=#C2FFFF
| 591032 ||  || — || December 23, 2012 || Haleakala || Pan-STARRS || L4(8060) || align=right | 7.7 km || 
|-id=033 bgcolor=#C2FFFF
| 591033 ||  || — || January 5, 2013 || Kitt Peak || Spacewatch || L4 || align=right | 9.9 km || 
|-id=034 bgcolor=#C2FFFF
| 591034 ||  || — || January 6, 2013 || Kitt Peak || Spacewatch || L4 || align=right | 7.9 km || 
|-id=035 bgcolor=#d6d6d6
| 591035 ||  || — || January 19, 2013 || Mount Lemmon || Mount Lemmon Survey ||  || align=right | 2.5 km || 
|-id=036 bgcolor=#d6d6d6
| 591036 ||  || — || January 1, 2008 || Mount Lemmon || Mount Lemmon Survey ||  || align=right | 2.1 km || 
|-id=037 bgcolor=#d6d6d6
| 591037 ||  || — || October 4, 2006 || Mount Lemmon || Mount Lemmon Survey ||  || align=right | 3.0 km || 
|-id=038 bgcolor=#fefefe
| 591038 ||  || — || February 18, 2010 || Mount Lemmon || Mount Lemmon Survey ||  || align=right data-sort-value="0.49" | 490 m || 
|-id=039 bgcolor=#d6d6d6
| 591039 ||  || — || February 2, 2008 || Mount Lemmon || Mount Lemmon Survey ||  || align=right | 2.2 km || 
|-id=040 bgcolor=#d6d6d6
| 591040 ||  || — || January 11, 2008 || Mount Lemmon || Mount Lemmon Survey ||  || align=right | 2.8 km || 
|-id=041 bgcolor=#C2FFFF
| 591041 ||  || — || August 7, 2008 || Kitt Peak || Spacewatch || L4 || align=right | 8.6 km || 
|-id=042 bgcolor=#d6d6d6
| 591042 ||  || — || January 18, 2013 || Kitt Peak || Spacewatch ||  || align=right | 1.8 km || 
|-id=043 bgcolor=#C2FFFF
| 591043 ||  || — || December 22, 2012 || Haleakala || Pan-STARRS || L4 || align=right | 6.7 km || 
|-id=044 bgcolor=#E9E9E9
| 591044 ||  || — || December 23, 2012 || Haleakala || Pan-STARRS ||  || align=right | 1.9 km || 
|-id=045 bgcolor=#E9E9E9
| 591045 ||  || — || August 19, 2001 || Cerro Tololo || Cerro Tololo Obs. ||  || align=right | 2.1 km || 
|-id=046 bgcolor=#fefefe
| 591046 ||  || — || January 17, 2013 || Haleakala || Pan-STARRS ||  || align=right data-sort-value="0.54" | 540 m || 
|-id=047 bgcolor=#fefefe
| 591047 ||  || — || January 23, 2006 || Kitt Peak || Spacewatch ||  || align=right data-sort-value="0.54" | 540 m || 
|-id=048 bgcolor=#C2FFFF
| 591048 ||  || — || November 3, 2010 || Mount Lemmon || Mount Lemmon Survey || L4 || align=right | 7.2 km || 
|-id=049 bgcolor=#d6d6d6
| 591049 ||  || — || April 5, 2014 || Haleakala || Pan-STARRS ||  || align=right | 2.0 km || 
|-id=050 bgcolor=#C2FFFF
| 591050 ||  || — || January 19, 2013 || Kitt Peak || Spacewatch || L4 || align=right | 7.3 km || 
|-id=051 bgcolor=#d6d6d6
| 591051 ||  || — || January 16, 2013 || Haleakala || Pan-STARRS ||  || align=right | 2.2 km || 
|-id=052 bgcolor=#d6d6d6
| 591052 ||  || — || January 16, 2013 || Mount Lemmon || Mount Lemmon Survey ||  || align=right | 1.9 km || 
|-id=053 bgcolor=#d6d6d6
| 591053 ||  || — || January 16, 2013 || Catalina || CSS ||  || align=right | 2.6 km || 
|-id=054 bgcolor=#d6d6d6
| 591054 ||  || — || January 18, 2013 || Mount Lemmon || Mount Lemmon Survey ||  || align=right | 2.6 km || 
|-id=055 bgcolor=#C2FFFF
| 591055 ||  || — || January 19, 2013 || Kitt Peak || Spacewatch || L4 || align=right | 7.0 km || 
|-id=056 bgcolor=#C2FFFF
| 591056 ||  || — || January 22, 2013 || Kitt Peak || Spacewatch || L4 || align=right | 6.0 km || 
|-id=057 bgcolor=#d6d6d6
| 591057 ||  || — || January 10, 2013 || Haleakala || Pan-STARRS ||  || align=right | 2.5 km || 
|-id=058 bgcolor=#d6d6d6
| 591058 ||  || — || January 22, 2013 || Mount Lemmon || Mount Lemmon Survey ||  || align=right | 2.8 km || 
|-id=059 bgcolor=#d6d6d6
| 591059 ||  || — || January 10, 2013 || Kitt Peak || Spacewatch ||  || align=right | 2.4 km || 
|-id=060 bgcolor=#fefefe
| 591060 ||  || — || October 18, 2011 || Mount Lemmon || Mount Lemmon Survey ||  || align=right data-sort-value="0.79" | 790 m || 
|-id=061 bgcolor=#d6d6d6
| 591061 ||  || — || November 2, 2011 || Mount Lemmon || Mount Lemmon Survey ||  || align=right | 2.0 km || 
|-id=062 bgcolor=#d6d6d6
| 591062 ||  || — || January 9, 2013 || Kitt Peak || Spacewatch ||  || align=right | 2.3 km || 
|-id=063 bgcolor=#C2FFFF
| 591063 ||  || — || November 24, 2011 || Haleakala || Pan-STARRS || L4 || align=right | 8.2 km || 
|-id=064 bgcolor=#C2FFFF
| 591064 ||  || — || December 8, 2012 || Mount Lemmon || Mount Lemmon Survey || L4 || align=right | 7.5 km || 
|-id=065 bgcolor=#d6d6d6
| 591065 ||  || — || November 16, 2006 || Catalina || CSS ||  || align=right | 3.4 km || 
|-id=066 bgcolor=#C2FFFF
| 591066 ||  || — || October 27, 2008 || Mount Lemmon || Mount Lemmon Survey || L4 || align=right | 7.2 km || 
|-id=067 bgcolor=#C2FFFF
| 591067 ||  || — || January 18, 2013 || Mount Lemmon || Mount Lemmon Survey || L4 || align=right | 9.2 km || 
|-id=068 bgcolor=#E9E9E9
| 591068 ||  || — || September 12, 2007 || Mount Lemmon || Mount Lemmon Survey ||  || align=right | 1.5 km || 
|-id=069 bgcolor=#d6d6d6
| 591069 ||  || — || November 7, 2007 || Mount Lemmon || Mount Lemmon Survey ||  || align=right | 2.7 km || 
|-id=070 bgcolor=#d6d6d6
| 591070 ||  || — || December 6, 2007 || Kitt Peak || Spacewatch ||  || align=right | 2.9 km || 
|-id=071 bgcolor=#C2FFFF
| 591071 ||  || — || February 2, 2013 || Mount Lemmon || Mount Lemmon Survey || L4 || align=right | 7.3 km || 
|-id=072 bgcolor=#C2FFFF
| 591072 ||  || — || November 27, 2011 || Mount Lemmon || Mount Lemmon Survey || L4 || align=right | 8.3 km || 
|-id=073 bgcolor=#fefefe
| 591073 ||  || — || September 18, 2011 || Haleakala || J. D. Armstrong ||  || align=right data-sort-value="0.68" | 680 m || 
|-id=074 bgcolor=#d6d6d6
| 591074 ||  || — || March 23, 2003 || Apache Point || SDSS Collaboration || EOS || align=right | 1.7 km || 
|-id=075 bgcolor=#fefefe
| 591075 ||  || — || February 3, 1997 || Kitt Peak || Spacewatch ||  || align=right data-sort-value="0.49" | 490 m || 
|-id=076 bgcolor=#d6d6d6
| 591076 ||  || — || February 9, 2013 || Oukaimeden || C. Rinner ||  || align=right | 2.6 km || 
|-id=077 bgcolor=#C2FFFF
| 591077 ||  || — || February 8, 2002 || Kitt Peak || Spacewatch || L4 || align=right | 6.8 km || 
|-id=078 bgcolor=#fefefe
| 591078 ||  || — || February 8, 2013 || Haleakala || Pan-STARRS ||  || align=right data-sort-value="0.56" | 560 m || 
|-id=079 bgcolor=#fefefe
| 591079 ||  || — || January 7, 2013 || Kitt Peak || Spacewatch ||  || align=right data-sort-value="0.57" | 570 m || 
|-id=080 bgcolor=#d6d6d6
| 591080 ||  || — || June 22, 2004 || Kitt Peak || Spacewatch ||  || align=right | 3.2 km || 
|-id=081 bgcolor=#d6d6d6
| 591081 ||  || — || February 5, 2013 || Kitt Peak || Spacewatch ||  || align=right | 2.5 km || 
|-id=082 bgcolor=#C2FFFF
| 591082 ||  || — || August 10, 2007 || Kitt Peak || Spacewatch || L4 || align=right | 7.9 km || 
|-id=083 bgcolor=#d6d6d6
| 591083 ||  || — || January 17, 2013 || Mount Lemmon || Mount Lemmon Survey ||  || align=right | 2.2 km || 
|-id=084 bgcolor=#d6d6d6
| 591084 ||  || — || January 17, 2013 || Kitt Peak || Spacewatch ||  || align=right | 2.7 km || 
|-id=085 bgcolor=#C2FFFF
| 591085 ||  || — || September 6, 2008 || Mount Lemmon || Mount Lemmon Survey || L4 || align=right | 7.1 km || 
|-id=086 bgcolor=#d6d6d6
| 591086 ||  || — || September 14, 2005 || Kitt Peak || Spacewatch || EOS || align=right | 2.2 km || 
|-id=087 bgcolor=#C2FFFF
| 591087 ||  || — || September 25, 2008 || Mount Lemmon || Mount Lemmon Survey || L4 || align=right | 9.6 km || 
|-id=088 bgcolor=#fefefe
| 591088 ||  || — || October 3, 2008 || Mount Lemmon || Mount Lemmon Survey ||  || align=right data-sort-value="0.63" | 630 m || 
|-id=089 bgcolor=#d6d6d6
| 591089 ||  || — || February 28, 2008 || Mount Lemmon || Mount Lemmon Survey ||  || align=right | 1.9 km || 
|-id=090 bgcolor=#fefefe
| 591090 ||  || — || February 10, 2013 || Haleakala || Pan-STARRS ||  || align=right data-sort-value="0.51" | 510 m || 
|-id=091 bgcolor=#d6d6d6
| 591091 ||  || — || September 4, 2010 || Marly || P. Kocher ||  || align=right | 3.0 km || 
|-id=092 bgcolor=#fefefe
| 591092 ||  || — || November 10, 2004 || Kitt Peak || M. W. Buie, L. H. Wasserman ||  || align=right data-sort-value="0.61" | 610 m || 
|-id=093 bgcolor=#fefefe
| 591093 ||  || — || January 26, 2003 || Haleakala || AMOS ||  || align=right data-sort-value="0.87" | 870 m || 
|-id=094 bgcolor=#d6d6d6
| 591094 ||  || — || April 1, 2003 || Apache Point || SDSS Collaboration || EOS || align=right | 1.8 km || 
|-id=095 bgcolor=#d6d6d6
| 591095 ||  || — || February 12, 2013 || ESA OGS || ESA OGS ||  || align=right | 2.6 km || 
|-id=096 bgcolor=#E9E9E9
| 591096 ||  || — || February 13, 2013 || Haleakala || Pan-STARRS ||  || align=right | 1.4 km || 
|-id=097 bgcolor=#d6d6d6
| 591097 ||  || — || February 7, 2008 || Kitt Peak || Spacewatch ||  || align=right | 2.9 km || 
|-id=098 bgcolor=#d6d6d6
| 591098 ||  || — || February 9, 2008 || Kitt Peak || Spacewatch ||  || align=right | 1.9 km || 
|-id=099 bgcolor=#d6d6d6
| 591099 ||  || — || February 14, 2002 || Kitt Peak || Spacewatch ||  || align=right | 2.3 km || 
|-id=100 bgcolor=#fefefe
| 591100 ||  || — || February 14, 2013 || Haleakala || Pan-STARRS ||  || align=right data-sort-value="0.57" | 570 m || 
|}

591101–591200 

|-bgcolor=#C2FFFF
| 591101 ||  || — || September 29, 2009 || Mount Lemmon || Mount Lemmon Survey || L4 || align=right | 6.8 km || 
|-id=102 bgcolor=#C2FFFF
| 591102 ||  || — || September 2, 2008 || Kitt Peak || Spacewatch || L4 || align=right | 7.6 km || 
|-id=103 bgcolor=#d6d6d6
| 591103 ||  || — || January 12, 2007 || 7300 || W. K. Y. Yeung ||  || align=right | 3.2 km || 
|-id=104 bgcolor=#d6d6d6
| 591104 ||  || — || January 17, 2013 || Mount Lemmon || Mount Lemmon Survey ||  || align=right | 3.2 km || 
|-id=105 bgcolor=#E9E9E9
| 591105 ||  || — || February 13, 2004 || Kitt Peak || Spacewatch ||  || align=right | 2.1 km || 
|-id=106 bgcolor=#d6d6d6
| 591106 ||  || — || September 19, 2001 || Apache Point || SDSS Collaboration ||  || align=right | 3.0 km || 
|-id=107 bgcolor=#d6d6d6
| 591107 ||  || — || January 20, 2013 || Kitt Peak || Spacewatch ||  || align=right | 2.1 km || 
|-id=108 bgcolor=#d6d6d6
| 591108 ||  || — || February 14, 2013 || Mount Lemmon || Mount Lemmon Survey ||  || align=right | 2.4 km || 
|-id=109 bgcolor=#d6d6d6
| 591109 ||  || — || February 14, 2013 || Kitt Peak || Spacewatch ||  || align=right | 3.2 km || 
|-id=110 bgcolor=#d6d6d6
| 591110 ||  || — || April 4, 2008 || Mount Lemmon || Mount Lemmon Survey ||  || align=right | 2.5 km || 
|-id=111 bgcolor=#d6d6d6
| 591111 ||  || — || February 1, 2013 || Kitt Peak || Spacewatch ||  || align=right | 2.8 km || 
|-id=112 bgcolor=#d6d6d6
| 591112 ||  || — || September 29, 2005 || Mount Lemmon || Mount Lemmon Survey ||  || align=right | 2.0 km || 
|-id=113 bgcolor=#fefefe
| 591113 ||  || — || February 14, 2013 || Kitt Peak || Spacewatch ||  || align=right data-sort-value="0.64" | 640 m || 
|-id=114 bgcolor=#d6d6d6
| 591114 ||  || — || February 28, 2008 || Kitt Peak || Spacewatch ||  || align=right | 2.4 km || 
|-id=115 bgcolor=#d6d6d6
| 591115 ||  || — || September 1, 2010 || Mount Lemmon || Mount Lemmon Survey ||  || align=right | 2.3 km || 
|-id=116 bgcolor=#d6d6d6
| 591116 ||  || — || March 31, 2008 || Kitt Peak || Spacewatch ||  || align=right | 2.1 km || 
|-id=117 bgcolor=#d6d6d6
| 591117 ||  || — || March 27, 2008 || Mount Lemmon || Mount Lemmon Survey ||  || align=right | 2.5 km || 
|-id=118 bgcolor=#d6d6d6
| 591118 ||  || — || March 27, 2008 || Kitt Peak || Spacewatch ||  || align=right | 2.8 km || 
|-id=119 bgcolor=#fefefe
| 591119 ||  || — || February 15, 2013 || Haleakala || Pan-STARRS ||  || align=right data-sort-value="0.69" | 690 m || 
|-id=120 bgcolor=#d6d6d6
| 591120 ||  || — || September 10, 2010 || Kitt Peak || Spacewatch ||  || align=right | 2.5 km || 
|-id=121 bgcolor=#fefefe
| 591121 ||  || — || January 31, 2006 || Kitt Peak || Spacewatch ||  || align=right data-sort-value="0.61" | 610 m || 
|-id=122 bgcolor=#fefefe
| 591122 ||  || — || October 27, 2005 || Kitt Peak || Spacewatch ||  || align=right data-sort-value="0.55" | 550 m || 
|-id=123 bgcolor=#C2FFFF
| 591123 ||  || — || February 8, 2013 || Haleakala || Pan-STARRS || L4 || align=right | 8.7 km || 
|-id=124 bgcolor=#d6d6d6
| 591124 ||  || — || January 9, 2013 || Kitt Peak || Spacewatch ||  || align=right | 2.7 km || 
|-id=125 bgcolor=#d6d6d6
| 591125 ||  || — || April 16, 1996 || Haleakala || AMOS ||  || align=right | 3.3 km || 
|-id=126 bgcolor=#d6d6d6
| 591126 ||  || — || October 1, 2005 || Kitt Peak || Spacewatch ||  || align=right | 3.2 km || 
|-id=127 bgcolor=#d6d6d6
| 591127 ||  || — || October 26, 2011 || Andrushivka || Y. Ivaščenko, P. Kyrylenko ||  || align=right | 2.8 km || 
|-id=128 bgcolor=#fefefe
| 591128 ||  || — || November 7, 2008 || Mount Lemmon || Mount Lemmon Survey ||  || align=right data-sort-value="0.61" | 610 m || 
|-id=129 bgcolor=#d6d6d6
| 591129 ||  || — || April 3, 2008 || Kitt Peak || Spacewatch ||  || align=right | 2.5 km || 
|-id=130 bgcolor=#d6d6d6
| 591130 ||  || — || October 25, 2011 || Haleakala || Pan-STARRS ||  || align=right | 3.5 km || 
|-id=131 bgcolor=#C2FFFF
| 591131 ||  || — || February 9, 2013 || Haleakala || Pan-STARRS || L4 || align=right | 7.5 km || 
|-id=132 bgcolor=#d6d6d6
| 591132 ||  || — || July 17, 2005 || Palomar || NEAT ||  || align=right | 3.2 km || 
|-id=133 bgcolor=#d6d6d6
| 591133 ||  || — || February 14, 2013 || Kitt Peak || Spacewatch ||  || align=right | 2.2 km || 
|-id=134 bgcolor=#fefefe
| 591134 ||  || — || April 8, 2010 || Kitt Peak || Spacewatch ||  || align=right data-sort-value="0.67" | 670 m || 
|-id=135 bgcolor=#C2FFFF
| 591135 ||  || — || September 16, 2009 || Kitt Peak || Spacewatch || L4 || align=right | 6.9 km || 
|-id=136 bgcolor=#C2FFFF
| 591136 ||  || — || November 8, 2010 || Mount Lemmon || Mount Lemmon Survey || L4 || align=right | 7.1 km || 
|-id=137 bgcolor=#C2FFFF
| 591137 ||  || — || November 17, 2009 || Mount Lemmon || Mount Lemmon Survey || L4 || align=right | 6.7 km || 
|-id=138 bgcolor=#C2FFFF
| 591138 ||  || — || November 25, 2011 || Haleakala || Pan-STARRS || L4 || align=right | 7.6 km || 
|-id=139 bgcolor=#E9E9E9
| 591139 ||  || — || July 5, 2005 || Mount Lemmon || Mount Lemmon Survey ||  || align=right | 1.9 km || 
|-id=140 bgcolor=#fefefe
| 591140 ||  || — || February 2, 2013 || Mount Lemmon || Mount Lemmon Survey ||  || align=right data-sort-value="0.50" | 500 m || 
|-id=141 bgcolor=#C2FFFF
| 591141 ||  || — || September 14, 2007 || Mount Lemmon || Mount Lemmon Survey || L4 || align=right | 8.7 km || 
|-id=142 bgcolor=#C2FFFF
| 591142 ||  || — || September 21, 2009 || Kitt Peak || Spacewatch || L4 || align=right | 6.5 km || 
|-id=143 bgcolor=#fefefe
| 591143 ||  || — || October 25, 2011 || Mount Lemmon || Mount Lemmon Survey ||  || align=right data-sort-value="0.62" | 620 m || 
|-id=144 bgcolor=#d6d6d6
| 591144 ||  || — || February 8, 2013 || Haleakala || Pan-STARRS ||  || align=right | 2.7 km || 
|-id=145 bgcolor=#d6d6d6
| 591145 ||  || — || October 24, 2011 || Haleakala || Pan-STARRS ||  || align=right | 1.9 km || 
|-id=146 bgcolor=#d6d6d6
| 591146 ||  || — || January 17, 2013 || Haleakala || Pan-STARRS ||  || align=right | 2.1 km || 
|-id=147 bgcolor=#d6d6d6
| 591147 ||  || — || February 8, 2013 || Haleakala || Pan-STARRS ||  || align=right | 2.2 km || 
|-id=148 bgcolor=#d6d6d6
| 591148 ||  || — || February 9, 2013 || Haleakala || Pan-STARRS ||  || align=right | 2.6 km || 
|-id=149 bgcolor=#C2FFFF
| 591149 ||  || — || September 17, 2009 || Kitt Peak || Spacewatch || L4 || align=right | 6.1 km || 
|-id=150 bgcolor=#C2FFFF
| 591150 ||  || — || December 14, 2010 || Mount Lemmon || Mount Lemmon Survey || L4 || align=right | 6.1 km || 
|-id=151 bgcolor=#C2FFFF
| 591151 ||  || — || September 15, 2009 || Kitt Peak || Spacewatch || L4 || align=right | 6.4 km || 
|-id=152 bgcolor=#d6d6d6
| 591152 ||  || — || September 19, 2010 || Kitt Peak || Spacewatch ||  || align=right | 2.2 km || 
|-id=153 bgcolor=#d6d6d6
| 591153 ||  || — || February 7, 2013 || Kitt Peak || Spacewatch ||  || align=right | 2.5 km || 
|-id=154 bgcolor=#d6d6d6
| 591154 ||  || — || January 26, 2007 || Kitt Peak || Spacewatch ||  || align=right | 2.5 km || 
|-id=155 bgcolor=#d6d6d6
| 591155 ||  || — || July 27, 2015 || Haleakala || Pan-STARRS ||  || align=right | 2.2 km || 
|-id=156 bgcolor=#E9E9E9
| 591156 ||  || — || February 5, 2000 || Kitt Peak || Spacewatch ||  || align=right | 1.3 km || 
|-id=157 bgcolor=#fefefe
| 591157 ||  || — || February 15, 2013 || Haleakala || Pan-STARRS ||  || align=right data-sort-value="0.70" | 700 m || 
|-id=158 bgcolor=#d6d6d6
| 591158 ||  || — || February 13, 2013 || Haleakala || Pan-STARRS ||  || align=right | 2.4 km || 
|-id=159 bgcolor=#fefefe
| 591159 ||  || — || December 8, 2015 || Mount Lemmon || Mount Lemmon Survey ||  || align=right data-sort-value="0.50" | 500 m || 
|-id=160 bgcolor=#C2FFFF
| 591160 ||  || — || January 26, 2012 || Haleakala || Pan-STARRS || L4 || align=right | 6.0 km || 
|-id=161 bgcolor=#fefefe
| 591161 ||  || — || February 14, 2013 || Haleakala || Pan-STARRS ||  || align=right data-sort-value="0.56" | 560 m || 
|-id=162 bgcolor=#fefefe
| 591162 ||  || — || February 9, 2013 || Haleakala || Pan-STARRS ||  || align=right data-sort-value="0.66" | 660 m || 
|-id=163 bgcolor=#C2FFFF
| 591163 ||  || — || February 13, 2013 || Haleakala || Pan-STARRS || L4 || align=right | 7.2 km || 
|-id=164 bgcolor=#fefefe
| 591164 ||  || — || February 6, 2013 || Kitt Peak || Spacewatch ||  || align=right data-sort-value="0.53" | 530 m || 
|-id=165 bgcolor=#fefefe
| 591165 ||  || — || February 15, 2013 || Haleakala || Pan-STARRS ||  || align=right data-sort-value="0.65" | 650 m || 
|-id=166 bgcolor=#fefefe
| 591166 ||  || — || February 9, 2013 || Haleakala || Pan-STARRS ||  || align=right data-sort-value="0.50" | 500 m || 
|-id=167 bgcolor=#d6d6d6
| 591167 ||  || — || February 15, 2013 || Haleakala || Pan-STARRS ||  || align=right | 2.4 km || 
|-id=168 bgcolor=#fefefe
| 591168 ||  || — || February 9, 2013 || Haleakala || Pan-STARRS ||  || align=right data-sort-value="0.51" | 510 m || 
|-id=169 bgcolor=#fefefe
| 591169 ||  || — || February 11, 2013 || Catalina || CSS ||  || align=right data-sort-value="0.68" | 680 m || 
|-id=170 bgcolor=#d6d6d6
| 591170 ||  || — || November 24, 2011 || Mount Lemmon || Mount Lemmon Survey ||  || align=right | 1.9 km || 
|-id=171 bgcolor=#d6d6d6
| 591171 ||  || — || January 9, 2007 || Mount Lemmon || Mount Lemmon Survey ||  || align=right | 2.0 km || 
|-id=172 bgcolor=#fefefe
| 591172 ||  || — || January 9, 2006 || Kitt Peak || Spacewatch ||  || align=right data-sort-value="0.88" | 880 m || 
|-id=173 bgcolor=#d6d6d6
| 591173 ||  || — || March 12, 2003 || Kitt Peak || Spacewatch ||  || align=right | 3.2 km || 
|-id=174 bgcolor=#d6d6d6
| 591174 ||  || — || February 8, 2013 || Haleakala || Pan-STARRS ||  || align=right | 2.3 km || 
|-id=175 bgcolor=#d6d6d6
| 591175 ||  || — || April 30, 2009 || Kitt Peak || Spacewatch ||  || align=right | 2.9 km || 
|-id=176 bgcolor=#fefefe
| 591176 ||  || — || February 17, 2013 || Mount Lemmon || Mount Lemmon Survey ||  || align=right data-sort-value="0.66" | 660 m || 
|-id=177 bgcolor=#d6d6d6
| 591177 ||  || — || February 17, 2013 || Mount Lemmon || Mount Lemmon Survey ||  || align=right | 2.3 km || 
|-id=178 bgcolor=#E9E9E9
| 591178 ||  || — || February 14, 2013 || Haleakala || Pan-STARRS ||  || align=right | 2.0 km || 
|-id=179 bgcolor=#FFC2E0
| 591179 ||  || — || March 4, 2013 || Siding Spring || SSS || AMO || align=right data-sort-value="0.17" | 170 m || 
|-id=180 bgcolor=#fefefe
| 591180 ||  || — || February 14, 2013 || Haleakala || Pan-STARRS ||  || align=right data-sort-value="0.67" | 670 m || 
|-id=181 bgcolor=#d6d6d6
| 591181 ||  || — || February 7, 2013 || Kitt Peak || Spacewatch ||  || align=right | 2.7 km || 
|-id=182 bgcolor=#d6d6d6
| 591182 ||  || — || April 14, 2008 || Mount Lemmon || Mount Lemmon Survey ||  || align=right | 2.4 km || 
|-id=183 bgcolor=#d6d6d6
| 591183 ||  || — || September 16, 2004 || Kitt Peak || Spacewatch ||  || align=right | 3.0 km || 
|-id=184 bgcolor=#C2FFFF
| 591184 ||  || — || November 6, 2010 || Mount Lemmon || Mount Lemmon Survey || L4 || align=right | 6.3 km || 
|-id=185 bgcolor=#d6d6d6
| 591185 ||  || — || February 14, 2013 || Haleakala || Pan-STARRS ||  || align=right | 2.4 km || 
|-id=186 bgcolor=#fefefe
| 591186 ||  || — || December 4, 2005 || Kitt Peak || Spacewatch ||  || align=right data-sort-value="0.45" | 450 m || 
|-id=187 bgcolor=#d6d6d6
| 591187 ||  || — || November 30, 2011 || Mount Lemmon || Mount Lemmon Survey ||  || align=right | 2.1 km || 
|-id=188 bgcolor=#C2FFFF
| 591188 ||  || — || August 24, 2008 || Kitt Peak || Spacewatch || L4 || align=right | 7.4 km || 
|-id=189 bgcolor=#d6d6d6
| 591189 ||  || — || March 7, 2013 || Kitt Peak || Spacewatch ||  || align=right | 2.4 km || 
|-id=190 bgcolor=#d6d6d6
| 591190 ||  || — || September 16, 2010 || Mount Lemmon || Mount Lemmon Survey ||  || align=right | 2.4 km || 
|-id=191 bgcolor=#d6d6d6
| 591191 ||  || — || November 3, 2005 || Mount Lemmon || Mount Lemmon Survey ||  || align=right | 3.3 km || 
|-id=192 bgcolor=#C2FFFF
| 591192 ||  || — || January 9, 2013 || Kitt Peak || Spacewatch || L4 || align=right | 7.3 km || 
|-id=193 bgcolor=#d6d6d6
| 591193 ||  || — || October 17, 2010 || Mayhill-ISON || L. Elenin ||  || align=right | 3.8 km || 
|-id=194 bgcolor=#E9E9E9
| 591194 ||  || — || May 27, 2009 || Palomar || PTF ||  || align=right | 2.0 km || 
|-id=195 bgcolor=#d6d6d6
| 591195 ||  || — || March 15, 2002 || Palomar || NEAT ||  || align=right | 4.2 km || 
|-id=196 bgcolor=#d6d6d6
| 591196 ||  || — || February 17, 2013 || Kitt Peak || Spacewatch ||  || align=right | 2.2 km || 
|-id=197 bgcolor=#d6d6d6
| 591197 ||  || — || February 14, 2002 || Kitt Peak || Spacewatch ||  || align=right | 2.4 km || 
|-id=198 bgcolor=#d6d6d6
| 591198 ||  || — || September 2, 2010 || Mount Lemmon || Mount Lemmon Survey ||  || align=right | 1.8 km || 
|-id=199 bgcolor=#E9E9E9
| 591199 ||  || — || March 6, 2013 || Haleakala || Pan-STARRS ||  || align=right | 1.6 km || 
|-id=200 bgcolor=#d6d6d6
| 591200 ||  || — || August 28, 2005 || Kitt Peak || Spacewatch ||  || align=right | 2.7 km || 
|}

591201–591300 

|-bgcolor=#d6d6d6
| 591201 ||  || — || March 6, 2013 || Haleakala || Pan-STARRS ||  || align=right | 2.6 km || 
|-id=202 bgcolor=#fefefe
| 591202 ||  || — || October 9, 2008 || Kitt Peak || Spacewatch ||  || align=right data-sort-value="0.50" | 500 m || 
|-id=203 bgcolor=#d6d6d6
| 591203 ||  || — || March 10, 2007 || Mount Lemmon || Mount Lemmon Survey ||  || align=right | 1.8 km || 
|-id=204 bgcolor=#d6d6d6
| 591204 ||  || — || October 30, 2010 || Mount Lemmon || Mount Lemmon Survey ||  || align=right | 2.6 km || 
|-id=205 bgcolor=#d6d6d6
| 591205 ||  || — || February 14, 2013 || Haleakala || Pan-STARRS ||  || align=right | 2.1 km || 
|-id=206 bgcolor=#d6d6d6
| 591206 ||  || — || September 10, 2010 || Mount Lemmon || Mount Lemmon Survey ||  || align=right | 2.5 km || 
|-id=207 bgcolor=#d6d6d6
| 591207 ||  || — || March 7, 2013 || Mount Lemmon || Mount Lemmon Survey ||  || align=right | 2.6 km || 
|-id=208 bgcolor=#d6d6d6
| 591208 ||  || — || April 29, 2008 || Kitt Peak || Spacewatch ||  || align=right | 2.4 km || 
|-id=209 bgcolor=#d6d6d6
| 591209 ||  || — || December 16, 2006 || Mount Lemmon || Mount Lemmon Survey ||  || align=right | 2.1 km || 
|-id=210 bgcolor=#d6d6d6
| 591210 ||  || — || October 25, 2005 || Kitt Peak || Spacewatch ||  || align=right | 2.3 km || 
|-id=211 bgcolor=#d6d6d6
| 591211 ||  || — || August 13, 2004 || Cerro Tololo || Cerro Tololo Obs. ||  || align=right | 2.6 km || 
|-id=212 bgcolor=#d6d6d6
| 591212 ||  || — || October 28, 2010 || Mount Lemmon || Mount Lemmon Survey ||  || align=right | 2.4 km || 
|-id=213 bgcolor=#d6d6d6
| 591213 ||  || — || April 6, 2008 || Mount Lemmon || Mount Lemmon Survey ||  || align=right | 2.9 km || 
|-id=214 bgcolor=#FA8072
| 591214 ||  || — || March 13, 2013 || Catalina || CSS ||  || align=right data-sort-value="0.46" | 460 m || 
|-id=215 bgcolor=#fefefe
| 591215 ||  || — || October 7, 2005 || Mauna Kea || Mauna Kea Obs. ||  || align=right data-sort-value="0.88" | 880 m || 
|-id=216 bgcolor=#d6d6d6
| 591216 ||  || — || January 9, 2002 || Socorro || LINEAR ||  || align=right | 2.3 km || 
|-id=217 bgcolor=#d6d6d6
| 591217 ||  || — || October 11, 2010 || Mount Lemmon || Mount Lemmon Survey ||  || align=right | 3.0 km || 
|-id=218 bgcolor=#d6d6d6
| 591218 ||  || — || November 28, 2011 || Mount Lemmon || Mount Lemmon Survey ||  || align=right | 2.0 km || 
|-id=219 bgcolor=#fefefe
| 591219 ||  || — || May 5, 2010 || Mount Lemmon || Mount Lemmon Survey ||  || align=right data-sort-value="0.54" | 540 m || 
|-id=220 bgcolor=#fefefe
| 591220 ||  || — || March 13, 2013 || Mount Lemmon || Mount Lemmon Survey ||  || align=right data-sort-value="0.61" | 610 m || 
|-id=221 bgcolor=#d6d6d6
| 591221 ||  || — || December 13, 2006 || Kitt Peak || Spacewatch ||  || align=right | 2.7 km || 
|-id=222 bgcolor=#d6d6d6
| 591222 ||  || — || February 17, 2013 || Kitt Peak || Spacewatch ||  || align=right | 2.9 km || 
|-id=223 bgcolor=#d6d6d6
| 591223 ||  || — || March 13, 2013 || Kitt Peak || Spacewatch || Tj (2.94) || align=right | 3.2 km || 
|-id=224 bgcolor=#fefefe
| 591224 ||  || — || March 15, 2013 || Kitt Peak || Spacewatch ||  || align=right data-sort-value="0.52" | 520 m || 
|-id=225 bgcolor=#d6d6d6
| 591225 ||  || — || November 25, 2005 || Mount Lemmon || Mount Lemmon Survey ||  || align=right | 2.0 km || 
|-id=226 bgcolor=#d6d6d6
| 591226 ||  || — || February 28, 2008 || Kitt Peak || Spacewatch ||  || align=right | 2.2 km || 
|-id=227 bgcolor=#E9E9E9
| 591227 ||  || — || August 10, 2010 || Kitt Peak || Spacewatch ||  || align=right | 1.4 km || 
|-id=228 bgcolor=#d6d6d6
| 591228 ||  || — || December 21, 2006 || Kitt Peak || Spacewatch ||  || align=right | 2.0 km || 
|-id=229 bgcolor=#C2FFFF
| 591229 ||  || — || October 9, 2010 || Mount Lemmon || Mount Lemmon Survey || L4 || align=right | 6.7 km || 
|-id=230 bgcolor=#C2FFFF
| 591230 ||  || — || October 11, 2010 || Mount Lemmon || Mount Lemmon Survey || L4 || align=right | 6.6 km || 
|-id=231 bgcolor=#fefefe
| 591231 ||  || — || January 10, 2013 || Haleakala || Pan-STARRS ||  || align=right data-sort-value="0.42" | 420 m || 
|-id=232 bgcolor=#fefefe
| 591232 ||  || — || March 13, 2013 || Kitt Peak || M. W. Buie ||  || align=right data-sort-value="0.60" | 600 m || 
|-id=233 bgcolor=#fefefe
| 591233 ||  || — || September 28, 2003 || Kitt Peak || Spacewatch ||  || align=right data-sort-value="0.56" | 560 m || 
|-id=234 bgcolor=#d6d6d6
| 591234 ||  || — || March 5, 2013 || Mount Lemmon || Mount Lemmon Survey ||  || align=right | 2.2 km || 
|-id=235 bgcolor=#d6d6d6
| 591235 ||  || — || March 8, 2013 || Haleakala || Pan-STARRS ||  || align=right | 2.4 km || 
|-id=236 bgcolor=#d6d6d6
| 591236 ||  || — || March 14, 2013 || Catalina || CSS || 7:4 || align=right | 2.5 km || 
|-id=237 bgcolor=#d6d6d6
| 591237 ||  || — || March 5, 2013 || Haleakala || Pan-STARRS ||  || align=right | 2.6 km || 
|-id=238 bgcolor=#d6d6d6
| 591238 ||  || — || March 5, 2013 || Mount Lemmon || Mount Lemmon Survey ||  || align=right | 2.5 km || 
|-id=239 bgcolor=#d6d6d6
| 591239 ||  || — || October 28, 2016 || Haleakala || Pan-STARRS ||  || align=right | 2.1 km || 
|-id=240 bgcolor=#fefefe
| 591240 ||  || — || March 14, 2013 || Kitt Peak || Spacewatch ||  || align=right data-sort-value="0.62" | 620 m || 
|-id=241 bgcolor=#fefefe
| 591241 ||  || — || March 13, 2013 || Mount Lemmon || Mount Lemmon Survey ||  || align=right data-sort-value="0.58" | 580 m || 
|-id=242 bgcolor=#d6d6d6
| 591242 ||  || — || March 4, 2013 || Haleakala || Pan-STARRS ||  || align=right | 2.7 km || 
|-id=243 bgcolor=#d6d6d6
| 591243 ||  || — || March 5, 2013 || Haleakala || Pan-STARRS ||  || align=right | 2.5 km || 
|-id=244 bgcolor=#fefefe
| 591244 ||  || — || March 13, 2013 || Mount Lemmon || Mount Lemmon Survey ||  || align=right data-sort-value="0.56" | 560 m || 
|-id=245 bgcolor=#d6d6d6
| 591245 ||  || — || March 11, 2013 || Mount Lemmon || Mount Lemmon Survey ||  || align=right | 3.0 km || 
|-id=246 bgcolor=#d6d6d6
| 591246 ||  || — || March 31, 2008 || Mount Lemmon || Mount Lemmon Survey ||  || align=right | 3.3 km || 
|-id=247 bgcolor=#d6d6d6
| 591247 ||  || — || January 25, 2007 || Kitt Peak || Spacewatch ||  || align=right | 3.1 km || 
|-id=248 bgcolor=#d6d6d6
| 591248 ||  || — || February 8, 2007 || Mount Lemmon || Mount Lemmon Survey || Tj (2.99) || align=right | 3.5 km || 
|-id=249 bgcolor=#d6d6d6
| 591249 ||  || — || October 17, 2010 || Mount Lemmon || Mount Lemmon Survey ||  || align=right | 2.8 km || 
|-id=250 bgcolor=#d6d6d6
| 591250 ||  || — || November 24, 2011 || Haleakala || Pan-STARRS ||  || align=right | 3.0 km || 
|-id=251 bgcolor=#d6d6d6
| 591251 ||  || — || March 19, 2013 || Palomar || PTF ||  || align=right | 2.7 km || 
|-id=252 bgcolor=#fefefe
| 591252 ||  || — || January 31, 2009 || Kitt Peak || Spacewatch ||  || align=right data-sort-value="0.64" | 640 m || 
|-id=253 bgcolor=#fefefe
| 591253 ||  || — || March 19, 2013 || Haleakala || Pan-STARRS ||  || align=right data-sort-value="0.66" | 660 m || 
|-id=254 bgcolor=#d6d6d6
| 591254 ||  || — || March 19, 2013 || Haleakala || Pan-STARRS ||  || align=right | 3.3 km || 
|-id=255 bgcolor=#d6d6d6
| 591255 ||  || — || March 14, 2013 || Palomar || PTF ||  || align=right | 3.4 km || 
|-id=256 bgcolor=#fefefe
| 591256 ||  || — || February 20, 2006 || Kitt Peak || Spacewatch ||  || align=right data-sort-value="0.73" | 730 m || 
|-id=257 bgcolor=#d6d6d6
| 591257 ||  || — || October 1, 2005 || Kitt Peak || Spacewatch ||  || align=right | 2.4 km || 
|-id=258 bgcolor=#fefefe
| 591258 ||  || — || March 26, 2006 || Kitt Peak || Spacewatch ||  || align=right data-sort-value="0.68" | 680 m || 
|-id=259 bgcolor=#fefefe
| 591259 ||  || — || March 24, 2006 || Mount Lemmon || Mount Lemmon Survey ||  || align=right data-sort-value="0.60" | 600 m || 
|-id=260 bgcolor=#fefefe
| 591260 ||  || — || March 23, 2013 || Palomar || PTF ||  || align=right data-sort-value="0.79" | 790 m || 
|-id=261 bgcolor=#fefefe
| 591261 ||  || — || March 23, 2013 || Mount Lemmon || Mount Lemmon Survey ||  || align=right data-sort-value="0.76" | 760 m || 
|-id=262 bgcolor=#fefefe
| 591262 ||  || — || March 12, 2013 || Mount Lemmon || Mount Lemmon Survey ||  || align=right data-sort-value="0.59" | 590 m || 
|-id=263 bgcolor=#d6d6d6
| 591263 ||  || — || October 13, 2010 || Mount Lemmon || Mount Lemmon Survey ||  || align=right | 2.8 km || 
|-id=264 bgcolor=#d6d6d6
| 591264 ||  || — || March 11, 2013 || Kitt Peak || Spacewatch ||  || align=right | 2.8 km || 
|-id=265 bgcolor=#d6d6d6
| 591265 ||  || — || January 27, 2007 || Kitt Peak || Spacewatch ||  || align=right | 2.8 km || 
|-id=266 bgcolor=#fefefe
| 591266 ||  || — || December 2, 2005 || Mauna Kea || Mauna Kea Obs. || NYS || align=right data-sort-value="0.58" | 580 m || 
|-id=267 bgcolor=#d6d6d6
| 591267 ||  || — || February 7, 2002 || Palomar || NEAT ||  || align=right | 2.4 km || 
|-id=268 bgcolor=#d6d6d6
| 591268 ||  || — || March 14, 2007 || Catalina || CSS || Tj (2.99) || align=right | 3.8 km || 
|-id=269 bgcolor=#fefefe
| 591269 ||  || — || March 13, 2013 || Haleakala || Pan-STARRS || (2076) || align=right data-sort-value="0.64" | 640 m || 
|-id=270 bgcolor=#d6d6d6
| 591270 ||  || — || April 5, 2013 || Palomar || PTF ||  || align=right | 3.2 km || 
|-id=271 bgcolor=#fefefe
| 591271 ||  || — || October 24, 2011 || Haleakala || Pan-STARRS ||  || align=right data-sort-value="0.70" | 700 m || 
|-id=272 bgcolor=#d6d6d6
| 591272 ||  || — || September 7, 2004 || Kitt Peak || Spacewatch ||  || align=right | 4.5 km || 
|-id=273 bgcolor=#d6d6d6
| 591273 ||  || — || March 20, 2007 || Mount Lemmon || Mount Lemmon Survey ||  || align=right | 2.6 km || 
|-id=274 bgcolor=#d6d6d6
| 591274 ||  || — || March 23, 2007 || Moletai || K. Černis, J. Zdanavičius ||  || align=right | 3.1 km || 
|-id=275 bgcolor=#d6d6d6
| 591275 ||  || — || November 11, 2010 || Mount Lemmon || Mount Lemmon Survey ||  || align=right | 2.8 km || 
|-id=276 bgcolor=#E9E9E9
| 591276 ||  || — || October 3, 2006 || Mount Lemmon || Mount Lemmon Survey ||  || align=right | 1.3 km || 
|-id=277 bgcolor=#fefefe
| 591277 ||  || — || November 4, 2007 || Mount Lemmon || Mount Lemmon Survey || MAS || align=right data-sort-value="0.62" | 620 m || 
|-id=278 bgcolor=#d6d6d6
| 591278 ||  || — || October 27, 2005 || Kitt Peak || Spacewatch ||  || align=right | 2.8 km || 
|-id=279 bgcolor=#d6d6d6
| 591279 ||  || — || October 14, 2010 || Dauban || C. Rinner, F. Kugel ||  || align=right | 3.1 km || 
|-id=280 bgcolor=#d6d6d6
| 591280 ||  || — || February 21, 2007 || Kitt Peak || Spacewatch ||  || align=right | 2.7 km || 
|-id=281 bgcolor=#d6d6d6
| 591281 ||  || — || October 11, 2010 || Mount Lemmon || Mount Lemmon Survey ||  || align=right | 2.8 km || 
|-id=282 bgcolor=#d6d6d6
| 591282 ||  || — || October 13, 2010 || Catalina || CSS ||  || align=right | 2.9 km || 
|-id=283 bgcolor=#E9E9E9
| 591283 ||  || — || April 2, 2005 || Mount Lemmon || Mount Lemmon Survey ||  || align=right data-sort-value="0.90" | 900 m || 
|-id=284 bgcolor=#fefefe
| 591284 ||  || — || March 16, 2013 || Kitt Peak || Spacewatch ||  || align=right data-sort-value="0.62" | 620 m || 
|-id=285 bgcolor=#fefefe
| 591285 ||  || — || April 6, 2013 || Mount Lemmon || Mount Lemmon Survey ||  || align=right data-sort-value="0.50" | 500 m || 
|-id=286 bgcolor=#fefefe
| 591286 ||  || — || January 31, 2009 || Kitt Peak || Spacewatch ||  || align=right data-sort-value="0.71" | 710 m || 
|-id=287 bgcolor=#fefefe
| 591287 ||  || — || April 11, 2013 || ESA OGS || ESA OGS ||  || align=right data-sort-value="0.71" | 710 m || 
|-id=288 bgcolor=#d6d6d6
| 591288 ||  || — || March 12, 2013 || Catalina || CSS ||  || align=right | 2.5 km || 
|-id=289 bgcolor=#fefefe
| 591289 ||  || — || January 20, 2009 || Mount Lemmon || Mount Lemmon Survey ||  || align=right data-sort-value="0.66" | 660 m || 
|-id=290 bgcolor=#d6d6d6
| 591290 ||  || — || April 14, 2013 || Fort Davis || J. G. Ries || VER || align=right | 2.6 km || 
|-id=291 bgcolor=#d6d6d6
| 591291 ||  || — || October 2, 2010 || Mount Lemmon || Mount Lemmon Survey ||  || align=right | 3.7 km || 
|-id=292 bgcolor=#d6d6d6
| 591292 ||  || — || January 20, 2012 || Kitt Peak || Spacewatch ||  || align=right | 3.0 km || 
|-id=293 bgcolor=#fefefe
| 591293 ||  || — || April 13, 2002 || Palomar || NEAT ||  || align=right | 1.0 km || 
|-id=294 bgcolor=#fefefe
| 591294 ||  || — || January 20, 2009 || Kitt Peak || Spacewatch ||  || align=right data-sort-value="0.69" | 690 m || 
|-id=295 bgcolor=#d6d6d6
| 591295 ||  || — || April 14, 2007 || Gaisberg || R. Gierlinger || LIX || align=right | 3.0 km || 
|-id=296 bgcolor=#d6d6d6
| 591296 ||  || — || November 1, 2010 || Piszkesteto || Z. Kuli || VER || align=right | 3.2 km || 
|-id=297 bgcolor=#fefefe
| 591297 ||  || — || April 10, 2013 || Haleakala || Pan-STARRS ||  || align=right data-sort-value="0.66" | 660 m || 
|-id=298 bgcolor=#fefefe
| 591298 ||  || — || March 27, 1996 || Kitt Peak || Spacewatch ||  || align=right data-sort-value="0.88" | 880 m || 
|-id=299 bgcolor=#fefefe
| 591299 ||  || — || March 18, 2013 || Kitt Peak || Spacewatch || NYS || align=right data-sort-value="0.55" | 550 m || 
|-id=300 bgcolor=#fefefe
| 591300 ||  || — || March 18, 2013 || Kitt Peak || Spacewatch ||  || align=right data-sort-value="0.64" | 640 m || 
|}

591301–591400 

|-bgcolor=#fefefe
| 591301 ||  || — || April 1, 2013 || Mount Lemmon || Mount Lemmon Survey || V || align=right data-sort-value="0.59" | 590 m || 
|-id=302 bgcolor=#d6d6d6
| 591302 ||  || — || October 16, 2010 || Charleston || R. Holmes ||  || align=right | 2.8 km || 
|-id=303 bgcolor=#fefefe
| 591303 ||  || — || September 29, 2011 || Mount Lemmon || Mount Lemmon Survey ||  || align=right data-sort-value="0.67" | 670 m || 
|-id=304 bgcolor=#d6d6d6
| 591304 ||  || — || September 29, 2005 || Mount Lemmon || Mount Lemmon Survey || Tj (2.96) || align=right | 3.5 km || 
|-id=305 bgcolor=#d6d6d6
| 591305 ||  || — || September 12, 2005 || Kitt Peak || Spacewatch ||  || align=right | 2.7 km || 
|-id=306 bgcolor=#fefefe
| 591306 ||  || — || February 27, 2006 || Kitt Peak || Spacewatch ||  || align=right data-sort-value="0.45" | 450 m || 
|-id=307 bgcolor=#fefefe
| 591307 ||  || — || April 13, 2013 || Haleakala || Pan-STARRS ||  || align=right data-sort-value="0.61" | 610 m || 
|-id=308 bgcolor=#fefefe
| 591308 ||  || — || April 15, 2013 || Haleakala || Pan-STARRS ||  || align=right data-sort-value="0.63" | 630 m || 
|-id=309 bgcolor=#fefefe
| 591309 ||  || — || April 11, 2013 || Kitt Peak || Spacewatch ||  || align=right data-sort-value="0.86" | 860 m || 
|-id=310 bgcolor=#d6d6d6
| 591310 ||  || — || January 27, 2007 || Kitt Peak || Spacewatch ||  || align=right | 2.7 km || 
|-id=311 bgcolor=#fefefe
| 591311 ||  || — || April 15, 2013 || Haleakala || Pan-STARRS ||  || align=right data-sort-value="0.56" | 560 m || 
|-id=312 bgcolor=#d6d6d6
| 591312 ||  || — || February 21, 2007 || Kitt Peak || Spacewatch ||  || align=right | 1.8 km || 
|-id=313 bgcolor=#fefefe
| 591313 ||  || — || April 10, 2013 || Haleakala || Pan-STARRS ||  || align=right data-sort-value="0.72" | 720 m || 
|-id=314 bgcolor=#fefefe
| 591314 ||  || — || April 13, 2013 || Haleakala || Pan-STARRS ||  || align=right data-sort-value="0.62" | 620 m || 
|-id=315 bgcolor=#d6d6d6
| 591315 ||  || — || December 25, 2005 || Kitt Peak || Spacewatch ||  || align=right | 2.5 km || 
|-id=316 bgcolor=#d6d6d6
| 591316 ||  || — || December 22, 2012 || Haleakala || Pan-STARRS ||  || align=right | 2.9 km || 
|-id=317 bgcolor=#fefefe
| 591317 ||  || — || July 9, 2010 || WISE || WISE ||  || align=right data-sort-value="0.87" | 870 m || 
|-id=318 bgcolor=#fefefe
| 591318 ||  || — || March 13, 2002 || Kitt Peak || Spacewatch || MAS || align=right data-sort-value="0.61" | 610 m || 
|-id=319 bgcolor=#fefefe
| 591319 ||  || — || March 16, 2013 || Kitt Peak || Spacewatch ||  || align=right data-sort-value="0.69" | 690 m || 
|-id=320 bgcolor=#fefefe
| 591320 ||  || — || April 8, 2013 || Mount Lemmon || Mount Lemmon Survey ||  || align=right data-sort-value="0.57" | 570 m || 
|-id=321 bgcolor=#fefefe
| 591321 ||  || — || April 16, 2013 || Cerro Tololo-DECam || CTIO-DECam ||  || align=right data-sort-value="0.51" | 510 m || 
|-id=322 bgcolor=#d6d6d6
| 591322 ||  || — || September 16, 2009 || Mount Lemmon || Mount Lemmon Survey ||  || align=right | 2.4 km || 
|-id=323 bgcolor=#fefefe
| 591323 ||  || — || April 11, 2013 || ESA OGS || ESA OGS ||  || align=right data-sort-value="0.58" | 580 m || 
|-id=324 bgcolor=#d6d6d6
| 591324 ||  || — || February 16, 2001 || Nogales || Tenagra II Obs. ||  || align=right | 2.6 km || 
|-id=325 bgcolor=#d6d6d6
| 591325 ||  || — || April 9, 2013 || Haleakala || Pan-STARRS ||  || align=right | 2.7 km || 
|-id=326 bgcolor=#fefefe
| 591326 ||  || — || March 13, 2013 || Kitt Peak || Spacewatch ||  || align=right data-sort-value="0.47" | 470 m || 
|-id=327 bgcolor=#d6d6d6
| 591327 ||  || — || February 1, 2012 || Mount Lemmon || Mount Lemmon Survey ||  || align=right | 2.1 km || 
|-id=328 bgcolor=#fefefe
| 591328 ||  || — || April 16, 2013 || Cerro Tololo-DECam || CTIO-DECam ||  || align=right data-sort-value="0.58" | 580 m || 
|-id=329 bgcolor=#d6d6d6
| 591329 ||  || — || March 16, 2007 || Mount Lemmon || Mount Lemmon Survey ||  || align=right | 3.0 km || 
|-id=330 bgcolor=#d6d6d6
| 591330 ||  || — || March 18, 2007 || Kitt Peak || Spacewatch ||  || align=right | 2.0 km || 
|-id=331 bgcolor=#d6d6d6
| 591331 ||  || — || April 9, 2013 || Haleakala || Pan-STARRS ||  || align=right | 2.2 km || 
|-id=332 bgcolor=#fefefe
| 591332 ||  || — || September 10, 2007 || Mount Lemmon || Mount Lemmon Survey ||  || align=right data-sort-value="0.64" | 640 m || 
|-id=333 bgcolor=#fefefe
| 591333 ||  || — || March 10, 2002 || Kitt Peak || Spacewatch || NYS || align=right data-sort-value="0.36" | 360 m || 
|-id=334 bgcolor=#d6d6d6
| 591334 ||  || — || April 10, 2013 || Haleakala || Pan-STARRS ||  || align=right | 1.6 km || 
|-id=335 bgcolor=#E9E9E9
| 591335 ||  || — || April 16, 2013 || Cerro Tololo-DECam || CTIO-DECam ||  || align=right | 1.2 km || 
|-id=336 bgcolor=#fefefe
| 591336 ||  || — || October 29, 2011 || Mayhill-ISON || L. Elenin ||  || align=right data-sort-value="0.62" | 620 m || 
|-id=337 bgcolor=#d6d6d6
| 591337 ||  || — || October 8, 2004 || Kitt Peak || Spacewatch ||  || align=right | 2.9 km || 
|-id=338 bgcolor=#d6d6d6
| 591338 ||  || — || October 10, 2004 || Kitt Peak || Spacewatch ||  || align=right | 2.3 km || 
|-id=339 bgcolor=#fefefe
| 591339 ||  || — || September 29, 2003 || Kitt Peak || Spacewatch ||  || align=right data-sort-value="0.52" | 520 m || 
|-id=340 bgcolor=#fefefe
| 591340 ||  || — || December 3, 2008 || Mount Lemmon || Mount Lemmon Survey ||  || align=right data-sort-value="0.50" | 500 m || 
|-id=341 bgcolor=#d6d6d6
| 591341 ||  || — || November 3, 2010 || Mount Lemmon || Mount Lemmon Survey ||  || align=right | 2.6 km || 
|-id=342 bgcolor=#d6d6d6
| 591342 ||  || — || January 21, 2002 || Kitt Peak || Spacewatch ||  || align=right | 1.7 km || 
|-id=343 bgcolor=#d6d6d6
| 591343 ||  || — || September 10, 2010 || Mount Lemmon || Mount Lemmon Survey ||  || align=right | 2.5 km || 
|-id=344 bgcolor=#d6d6d6
| 591344 ||  || — || October 4, 2004 || Kitt Peak || Spacewatch ||  || align=right | 2.6 km || 
|-id=345 bgcolor=#d6d6d6
| 591345 ||  || — || April 9, 2013 || Haleakala || Pan-STARRS ||  || align=right | 2.3 km || 
|-id=346 bgcolor=#d6d6d6
| 591346 ||  || — || October 9, 2005 || Kitt Peak || Spacewatch ||  || align=right | 2.7 km || 
|-id=347 bgcolor=#d6d6d6
| 591347 ||  || — || October 31, 2010 || Piszkesteto || Z. Kuli, K. Sárneczky ||  || align=right | 3.3 km || 
|-id=348 bgcolor=#fefefe
| 591348 ||  || — || September 22, 2003 || Kitt Peak || Spacewatch ||  || align=right data-sort-value="0.77" | 770 m || 
|-id=349 bgcolor=#d6d6d6
| 591349 ||  || — || October 15, 2004 || Mount Lemmon || Mount Lemmon Survey ||  || align=right | 3.4 km || 
|-id=350 bgcolor=#fefefe
| 591350 ||  || — || February 22, 2009 || Kitt Peak || Spacewatch ||  || align=right data-sort-value="0.61" | 610 m || 
|-id=351 bgcolor=#fefefe
| 591351 ||  || — || March 1, 2009 || Mount Lemmon || Mount Lemmon Survey ||  || align=right data-sort-value="0.61" | 610 m || 
|-id=352 bgcolor=#fefefe
| 591352 ||  || — || October 2, 2010 || Nogales || M. Schwartz, P. R. Holvorcem ||  || align=right data-sort-value="0.72" | 720 m || 
|-id=353 bgcolor=#d6d6d6
| 591353 ||  || — || April 17, 2013 || Mayhill-ISON || L. Elenin ||  || align=right | 3.6 km || 
|-id=354 bgcolor=#fefefe
| 591354 ||  || — || April 30, 2006 || Kitt Peak || Spacewatch ||  || align=right data-sort-value="0.70" | 700 m || 
|-id=355 bgcolor=#fefefe
| 591355 ||  || — || September 18, 2003 || Kitt Peak || Spacewatch ||  || align=right data-sort-value="0.71" | 710 m || 
|-id=356 bgcolor=#d6d6d6
| 591356 ||  || — || March 14, 2007 || Mount Lemmon || Mount Lemmon Survey ||  || align=right | 3.2 km || 
|-id=357 bgcolor=#fefefe
| 591357 ||  || — || January 29, 2009 || Mount Lemmon || Mount Lemmon Survey ||  || align=right data-sort-value="0.62" | 620 m || 
|-id=358 bgcolor=#fefefe
| 591358 ||  || — || May 8, 2013 || Haleakala || Pan-STARRS ||  || align=right data-sort-value="0.67" | 670 m || 
|-id=359 bgcolor=#fefefe
| 591359 ||  || — || March 15, 2009 || Kitt Peak || Spacewatch ||  || align=right data-sort-value="0.55" | 550 m || 
|-id=360 bgcolor=#fefefe
| 591360 ||  || — || May 3, 2013 || Haleakala || Pan-STARRS ||  || align=right data-sort-value="0.57" | 570 m || 
|-id=361 bgcolor=#fefefe
| 591361 ||  || — || February 21, 2009 || Kitt Peak || Spacewatch ||  || align=right data-sort-value="0.74" | 740 m || 
|-id=362 bgcolor=#fefefe
| 591362 ||  || — || March 11, 2005 || Kitt Peak || Spacewatch ||  || align=right data-sort-value="0.71" | 710 m || 
|-id=363 bgcolor=#fefefe
| 591363 ||  || — || February 1, 2005 || Kitt Peak || Spacewatch ||  || align=right data-sort-value="0.65" | 650 m || 
|-id=364 bgcolor=#fefefe
| 591364 ||  || — || November 17, 2011 || Mount Lemmon || Mount Lemmon Survey ||  || align=right data-sort-value="0.80" | 800 m || 
|-id=365 bgcolor=#fefefe
| 591365 ||  || — || June 30, 2013 || Haleakala || Pan-STARRS ||  || align=right data-sort-value="0.52" | 520 m || 
|-id=366 bgcolor=#fefefe
| 591366 ||  || — || June 15, 2013 || Mount Lemmon || Mount Lemmon Survey ||  || align=right data-sort-value="0.67" | 670 m || 
|-id=367 bgcolor=#fefefe
| 591367 ||  || — || January 16, 2005 || Kitt Peak || Spacewatch ||  || align=right data-sort-value="0.85" | 850 m || 
|-id=368 bgcolor=#fefefe
| 591368 ||  || — || June 7, 2002 || Palomar || NEAT ||  || align=right | 1.0 km || 
|-id=369 bgcolor=#fefefe
| 591369 ||  || — || June 18, 2013 || Haleakala || Pan-STARRS ||  || align=right data-sort-value="0.59" | 590 m || 
|-id=370 bgcolor=#C2E0FF
| 591370 ||  || — || June 18, 2013 || Haleakala || Pan-STARRS || centaur || align=right | 59 km || 
|-id=371 bgcolor=#fefefe
| 591371 ||  || — || June 18, 2013 || Haleakala || Pan-STARRS ||  || align=right data-sort-value="0.55" | 550 m || 
|-id=372 bgcolor=#fefefe
| 591372 ||  || — || January 21, 2012 || Haleakala || Pan-STARRS ||  || align=right data-sort-value="0.76" | 760 m || 
|-id=373 bgcolor=#fefefe
| 591373 ||  || — || December 2, 2010 || Mount Lemmon || Mount Lemmon Survey ||  || align=right data-sort-value="0.85" | 850 m || 
|-id=374 bgcolor=#fefefe
| 591374 ||  || — || February 13, 2008 || Mount Lemmon || Mount Lemmon Survey ||  || align=right data-sort-value="0.80" | 800 m || 
|-id=375 bgcolor=#E9E9E9
| 591375 ||  || — || July 13, 2013 || Haleakala || Pan-STARRS ||  || align=right | 1.2 km || 
|-id=376 bgcolor=#C2E0FF
| 591376 ||  || — || July 14, 2013 || Haleakala || Pan-STARRS || centaur || align=right | 97 km || 
|-id=377 bgcolor=#fefefe
| 591377 ||  || — || July 14, 2013 || Haleakala || Pan-STARRS ||  || align=right data-sort-value="0.78" | 780 m || 
|-id=378 bgcolor=#fefefe
| 591378 ||  || — || July 14, 2013 || Haleakala || Pan-STARRS ||  || align=right data-sort-value="0.68" | 680 m || 
|-id=379 bgcolor=#fefefe
| 591379 ||  || — || July 14, 2013 || Haleakala || Pan-STARRS ||  || align=right data-sort-value="0.60" | 600 m || 
|-id=380 bgcolor=#fefefe
| 591380 ||  || — || July 15, 2013 || Haleakala || Pan-STARRS ||  || align=right data-sort-value="0.57" | 570 m || 
|-id=381 bgcolor=#fefefe
| 591381 ||  || — || December 26, 2011 || Piszkesteto || K. Sárneczky ||  || align=right | 1.1 km || 
|-id=382 bgcolor=#fefefe
| 591382 ||  || — || August 3, 2013 || Haleakala || Pan-STARRS || H || align=right data-sort-value="0.53" | 530 m || 
|-id=383 bgcolor=#fefefe
| 591383 ||  || — || August 6, 2013 || ESA OGS || ESA OGS ||  || align=right data-sort-value="0.77" | 770 m || 
|-id=384 bgcolor=#fefefe
| 591384 ||  || — || February 1, 2012 || Mount Lemmon || Mount Lemmon Survey || H || align=right data-sort-value="0.55" | 550 m || 
|-id=385 bgcolor=#fefefe
| 591385 ||  || — || August 8, 2013 || Kitt Peak || Spacewatch ||  || align=right data-sort-value="0.64" | 640 m || 
|-id=386 bgcolor=#fefefe
| 591386 ||  || — || September 19, 1998 || Apache Point || SDSS Collaboration ||  || align=right data-sort-value="0.88" | 880 m || 
|-id=387 bgcolor=#E9E9E9
| 591387 ||  || — || April 6, 2008 || Kitt Peak || Spacewatch ||  || align=right data-sort-value="0.67" | 670 m || 
|-id=388 bgcolor=#fefefe
| 591388 ||  || — || January 31, 2012 || Mount Lemmon || Mount Lemmon Survey || H || align=right data-sort-value="0.54" | 540 m || 
|-id=389 bgcolor=#d6d6d6
| 591389 ||  || — || July 29, 2008 || Mount Lemmon || Mount Lemmon Survey ||  || align=right | 2.0 km || 
|-id=390 bgcolor=#fefefe
| 591390 ||  || — || October 4, 2006 || Mount Lemmon || Mount Lemmon Survey ||  || align=right data-sort-value="0.75" | 750 m || 
|-id=391 bgcolor=#E9E9E9
| 591391 ||  || — || September 27, 2000 || Kitt Peak || Spacewatch ||  || align=right | 1.4 km || 
|-id=392 bgcolor=#C2E0FF
| 591392 ||  || — || June 21, 2010 || Haleakala || Pan-STARRS || cubewano (hot) || align=right | 214 km || 
|-id=393 bgcolor=#fefefe
| 591393 ||  || — || August 4, 2013 || Haleakala || Pan-STARRS ||  || align=right data-sort-value="0.86" | 860 m || 
|-id=394 bgcolor=#E9E9E9
| 591394 ||  || — || August 15, 2013 || Haleakala || Pan-STARRS ||  || align=right data-sort-value="0.78" | 780 m || 
|-id=395 bgcolor=#fefefe
| 591395 ||  || — || August 4, 2013 || Haleakala || Pan-STARRS ||  || align=right data-sort-value="0.63" | 630 m || 
|-id=396 bgcolor=#fefefe
| 591396 ||  || — || August 5, 2013 || Piszkesteto || K. Sárneczky ||  || align=right data-sort-value="0.74" | 740 m || 
|-id=397 bgcolor=#E9E9E9
| 591397 ||  || — || August 15, 2013 || Haleakala || Pan-STARRS ||  || align=right data-sort-value="0.67" | 670 m || 
|-id=398 bgcolor=#E9E9E9
| 591398 ||  || — || August 9, 2013 || Kitt Peak || Spacewatch ||  || align=right | 1.4 km || 
|-id=399 bgcolor=#fefefe
| 591399 ||  || — || December 9, 2010 || Mount Lemmon || Mount Lemmon Survey ||  || align=right data-sort-value="0.89" | 890 m || 
|-id=400 bgcolor=#fefefe
| 591400 ||  || — || August 17, 2013 || Haleakala || Pan-STARRS || H || align=right data-sort-value="0.45" | 450 m || 
|}

591401–591500 

|-bgcolor=#d6d6d6
| 591401 ||  || — || July 30, 2013 || Kitt Peak || Spacewatch ||  || align=right | 2.6 km || 
|-id=402 bgcolor=#fefefe
| 591402 ||  || — || August 26, 2013 || Haleakala || Pan-STARRS ||  || align=right data-sort-value="0.72" | 720 m || 
|-id=403 bgcolor=#fefefe
| 591403 ||  || — || August 28, 2013 || Mount Lemmon || Mount Lemmon Survey ||  || align=right data-sort-value="0.66" | 660 m || 
|-id=404 bgcolor=#fefefe
| 591404 ||  || — || August 30, 2013 || Haleakala || Pan-STARRS || H || align=right data-sort-value="0.63" | 630 m || 
|-id=405 bgcolor=#fefefe
| 591405 ||  || — || June 17, 2013 || Mount Lemmon || Mount Lemmon Survey ||  || align=right data-sort-value="0.84" | 840 m || 
|-id=406 bgcolor=#fefefe
| 591406 ||  || — || February 10, 2011 || Mount Lemmon || Mount Lemmon Survey ||  || align=right data-sort-value="0.68" | 680 m || 
|-id=407 bgcolor=#d6d6d6
| 591407 ||  || — || August 8, 2013 || Kitt Peak || Spacewatch ||  || align=right | 2.4 km || 
|-id=408 bgcolor=#fefefe
| 591408 ||  || — || August 26, 2013 || Haleakala || Pan-STARRS ||  || align=right data-sort-value="0.89" | 890 m || 
|-id=409 bgcolor=#fefefe
| 591409 ||  || — || May 22, 2006 || Kitt Peak || Spacewatch ||  || align=right data-sort-value="0.68" | 680 m || 
|-id=410 bgcolor=#fefefe
| 591410 ||  || — || January 11, 2008 || Mount Lemmon || Mount Lemmon Survey ||  || align=right data-sort-value="0.75" | 750 m || 
|-id=411 bgcolor=#E9E9E9
| 591411 ||  || — || August 16, 2009 || Kitt Peak || Spacewatch ||  || align=right data-sort-value="0.64" | 640 m || 
|-id=412 bgcolor=#fefefe
| 591412 ||  || — || August 17, 2013 || Haleakala || Pan-STARRS ||  || align=right data-sort-value="0.65" | 650 m || 
|-id=413 bgcolor=#fefefe
| 591413 ||  || — || August 7, 2013 || ESA OGS || ESA OGS ||  || align=right data-sort-value="0.81" | 810 m || 
|-id=414 bgcolor=#fefefe
| 591414 ||  || — || August 8, 2013 || Kitt Peak || Spacewatch ||  || align=right data-sort-value="0.78" | 780 m || 
|-id=415 bgcolor=#fefefe
| 591415 ||  || — || August 5, 2013 || ESA OGS || ESA OGS ||  || align=right data-sort-value="0.94" | 940 m || 
|-id=416 bgcolor=#fefefe
| 591416 ||  || — || December 13, 2006 || Mount Lemmon || Mount Lemmon Survey ||  || align=right data-sort-value="0.54" | 540 m || 
|-id=417 bgcolor=#fefefe
| 591417 ||  || — || August 31, 2013 || Crni Vrh || J. Skvarč ||  || align=right data-sort-value="0.86" | 860 m || 
|-id=418 bgcolor=#E9E9E9
| 591418 ||  || — || January 19, 2015 || Catalina || CSS ||  || align=right | 1.1 km || 
|-id=419 bgcolor=#fefefe
| 591419 ||  || — || December 21, 2014 || Haleakala || Pan-STARRS ||  || align=right data-sort-value="0.71" | 710 m || 
|-id=420 bgcolor=#fefefe
| 591420 ||  || — || January 14, 2011 || Tzec Maun || E. Schwab ||  || align=right data-sort-value="0.96" | 960 m || 
|-id=421 bgcolor=#fefefe
| 591421 ||  || — || January 3, 2011 || Tzec Maun || E. Schwab ||  || align=right data-sort-value="0.84" | 840 m || 
|-id=422 bgcolor=#E9E9E9
| 591422 ||  || — || October 27, 2009 || Kitt Peak || Spacewatch ||  || align=right | 1.6 km || 
|-id=423 bgcolor=#fefefe
| 591423 ||  || — || February 28, 2008 || Kitt Peak || Spacewatch || MAS || align=right data-sort-value="0.93" | 930 m || 
|-id=424 bgcolor=#FA8072
| 591424 ||  || — || September 27, 2009 || Mount Lemmon || Mount Lemmon Survey ||  || align=right | 1.2 km || 
|-id=425 bgcolor=#fefefe
| 591425 ||  || — || August 1, 2009 || Kitt Peak || Spacewatch ||  || align=right data-sort-value="0.96" | 960 m || 
|-id=426 bgcolor=#FA8072
| 591426 ||  || — || September 2, 2013 || iTelescope || N. Falla || H || align=right data-sort-value="0.47" | 470 m || 
|-id=427 bgcolor=#fefefe
| 591427 ||  || — || November 10, 2006 || Kitt Peak || Spacewatch ||  || align=right | 1.1 km || 
|-id=428 bgcolor=#fefefe
| 591428 ||  || — || September 4, 2013 || Mount Lemmon || Mount Lemmon Survey || H || align=right data-sort-value="0.56" | 560 m || 
|-id=429 bgcolor=#fefefe
| 591429 ||  || — || September 5, 2013 || Catalina || CSS ||  || align=right data-sort-value="0.74" | 740 m || 
|-id=430 bgcolor=#fefefe
| 591430 ||  || — || January 19, 2004 || Socorro || LINEAR ||  || align=right | 1.8 km || 
|-id=431 bgcolor=#fefefe
| 591431 ||  || — || July 5, 2005 || Kitt Peak || Spacewatch ||  || align=right | 1.1 km || 
|-id=432 bgcolor=#fefefe
| 591432 ||  || — || September 1, 2013 || Mount Lemmon || Mount Lemmon Survey ||  || align=right data-sort-value="0.74" | 740 m || 
|-id=433 bgcolor=#fefefe
| 591433 ||  || — || February 26, 2012 || Haleakala || Pan-STARRS || H || align=right data-sort-value="0.61" | 610 m || 
|-id=434 bgcolor=#C2FFFF
| 591434 ||  || — || September 3, 2013 || Calar Alto || F. Hormuth || L5 || align=right | 6.9 km || 
|-id=435 bgcolor=#E9E9E9
| 591435 ||  || — || August 20, 2009 || Kitt Peak || Spacewatch ||  || align=right data-sort-value="0.64" | 640 m || 
|-id=436 bgcolor=#fefefe
| 591436 ||  || — || September 9, 2013 || Haleakala || Pan-STARRS ||  || align=right data-sort-value="0.72" | 720 m || 
|-id=437 bgcolor=#E9E9E9
| 591437 ||  || — || September 13, 2013 || Mount Lemmon || Mount Lemmon Survey ||  || align=right | 1.1 km || 
|-id=438 bgcolor=#fefefe
| 591438 ||  || — || September 6, 2013 || Kitt Peak || Spacewatch || H || align=right data-sort-value="0.64" | 640 m || 
|-id=439 bgcolor=#d6d6d6
| 591439 ||  || — || September 13, 2013 || Mount Lemmon || Mount Lemmon Survey ||  || align=right | 1.6 km || 
|-id=440 bgcolor=#fefefe
| 591440 ||  || — || June 19, 2010 || Catalina || CSS || H || align=right data-sort-value="0.65" | 650 m || 
|-id=441 bgcolor=#E9E9E9
| 591441 ||  || — || September 18, 2009 || Kitt Peak || Spacewatch ||  || align=right data-sort-value="0.62" | 620 m || 
|-id=442 bgcolor=#fefefe
| 591442 ||  || — || August 20, 2009 || Kitt Peak || Spacewatch ||  || align=right data-sort-value="0.72" | 720 m || 
|-id=443 bgcolor=#E9E9E9
| 591443 ||  || — || September 27, 2013 || Oukaimeden || C. Rinner ||  || align=right | 1.5 km || 
|-id=444 bgcolor=#E9E9E9
| 591444 ||  || — || September 28, 2001 || Palomar || NEAT ||  || align=right | 1.1 km || 
|-id=445 bgcolor=#E9E9E9
| 591445 ||  || — || February 21, 2006 || Mount Lemmon || Mount Lemmon Survey ||  || align=right | 1.7 km || 
|-id=446 bgcolor=#E9E9E9
| 591446 ||  || — || April 12, 2011 || Mount Lemmon || Mount Lemmon Survey ||  || align=right data-sort-value="0.76" | 760 m || 
|-id=447 bgcolor=#fefefe
| 591447 ||  || — || September 25, 2005 || Kitt Peak || Spacewatch || H || align=right data-sort-value="0.60" | 600 m || 
|-id=448 bgcolor=#fefefe
| 591448 ||  || — || November 16, 2006 || Lulin || LUSS ||  || align=right | 1.0 km || 
|-id=449 bgcolor=#fefefe
| 591449 ||  || — || August 5, 2005 || Palomar || NEAT ||  || align=right data-sort-value="0.74" | 740 m || 
|-id=450 bgcolor=#E9E9E9
| 591450 ||  || — || April 7, 2003 || Kitt Peak || Spacewatch ||  || align=right | 1.1 km || 
|-id=451 bgcolor=#E9E9E9
| 591451 ||  || — || September 1, 2013 || Mount Lemmon || Mount Lemmon Survey ||  || align=right data-sort-value="0.69" | 690 m || 
|-id=452 bgcolor=#d6d6d6
| 591452 ||  || — || September 25, 2013 || Mount Lemmon || Mount Lemmon Survey || 3:2 || align=right | 4.1 km || 
|-id=453 bgcolor=#fefefe
| 591453 ||  || — || September 14, 2013 || Haleakala || Pan-STARRS ||  || align=right data-sort-value="0.90" | 900 m || 
|-id=454 bgcolor=#E9E9E9
| 591454 ||  || — || February 27, 2015 || Haleakala || Pan-STARRS ||  || align=right data-sort-value="0.59" | 590 m || 
|-id=455 bgcolor=#d6d6d6
| 591455 ||  || — || February 24, 2017 || Haleakala || Pan-STARRS ||  || align=right | 3.0 km || 
|-id=456 bgcolor=#E9E9E9
| 591456 ||  || — || September 10, 2013 || Haleakala || Pan-STARRS ||  || align=right data-sort-value="0.74" | 740 m || 
|-id=457 bgcolor=#fefefe
| 591457 ||  || — || September 5, 2013 || Mayhill-ISON || L. Elenin ||  || align=right | 1.1 km || 
|-id=458 bgcolor=#E9E9E9
| 591458 ||  || — || October 1, 2013 || Mount Lemmon || Mount Lemmon Survey ||  || align=right data-sort-value="0.68" | 680 m || 
|-id=459 bgcolor=#E9E9E9
| 591459 ||  || — || March 6, 2002 || Palomar || NEAT ||  || align=right | 1.5 km || 
|-id=460 bgcolor=#fefefe
| 591460 ||  || — || December 4, 2002 || Kitt Peak || Kitt Peak Obs. ||  || align=right | 1.2 km || 
|-id=461 bgcolor=#E9E9E9
| 591461 ||  || — || October 4, 2013 || Mount Lemmon || Mount Lemmon Survey ||  || align=right data-sort-value="0.97" | 970 m || 
|-id=462 bgcolor=#E9E9E9
| 591462 ||  || — || April 27, 2012 || Haleakala || Pan-STARRS ||  || align=right data-sort-value="0.98" | 980 m || 
|-id=463 bgcolor=#E9E9E9
| 591463 ||  || — || September 18, 2009 || Kitt Peak || Spacewatch ||  || align=right data-sort-value="0.72" | 720 m || 
|-id=464 bgcolor=#E9E9E9
| 591464 ||  || — || April 1, 2003 || Palomar || NEAT ||  || align=right | 1.2 km || 
|-id=465 bgcolor=#E9E9E9
| 591465 ||  || — || October 4, 2013 || Kitt Peak || Spacewatch ||  || align=right data-sort-value="0.67" | 670 m || 
|-id=466 bgcolor=#E9E9E9
| 591466 ||  || — || October 11, 2005 || Kitt Peak || Spacewatch ||  || align=right data-sort-value="0.80" | 800 m || 
|-id=467 bgcolor=#E9E9E9
| 591467 ||  || — || October 1, 2013 || Mount Lemmon || Mount Lemmon Survey ||  || align=right data-sort-value="0.79" | 790 m || 
|-id=468 bgcolor=#fefefe
| 591468 ||  || — || July 4, 2005 || Palomar || NEAT ||  || align=right data-sort-value="0.84" | 840 m || 
|-id=469 bgcolor=#E9E9E9
| 591469 ||  || — || September 30, 2005 || Mount Lemmon || Mount Lemmon Survey ||  || align=right data-sort-value="0.60" | 600 m || 
|-id=470 bgcolor=#d6d6d6
| 591470 ||  || — || September 30, 2005 || Kitt Peak || Spacewatch || 3:2 || align=right | 3.6 km || 
|-id=471 bgcolor=#E9E9E9
| 591471 ||  || — || November 5, 2005 || Catalina || CSS ||  || align=right data-sort-value="0.88" | 880 m || 
|-id=472 bgcolor=#E9E9E9
| 591472 ||  || — || December 29, 2005 || Mount Lemmon || Mount Lemmon Survey ||  || align=right | 1.2 km || 
|-id=473 bgcolor=#E9E9E9
| 591473 ||  || — || October 24, 2009 || Kitt Peak || Spacewatch ||  || align=right data-sort-value="0.99" | 990 m || 
|-id=474 bgcolor=#E9E9E9
| 591474 ||  || — || October 7, 2013 || Kitt Peak || Spacewatch ||  || align=right | 1.1 km || 
|-id=475 bgcolor=#E9E9E9
| 591475 ||  || — || October 16, 2009 || Mount Lemmon || Mount Lemmon Survey ||  || align=right data-sort-value="0.75" | 750 m || 
|-id=476 bgcolor=#d6d6d6
| 591476 ||  || — || August 10, 2007 || Kitt Peak || Spacewatch ||  || align=right | 2.4 km || 
|-id=477 bgcolor=#E9E9E9
| 591477 ||  || — || October 3, 2013 || Haleakala || Pan-STARRS ||  || align=right | 1.8 km || 
|-id=478 bgcolor=#E9E9E9
| 591478 ||  || — || November 9, 2009 || Kitt Peak || Spacewatch ||  || align=right data-sort-value="0.82" | 820 m || 
|-id=479 bgcolor=#E9E9E9
| 591479 ||  || — || October 14, 2009 || Bergisch Gladbach || W. Bickel ||  || align=right | 1.1 km || 
|-id=480 bgcolor=#E9E9E9
| 591480 ||  || — || October 5, 2013 || Haleakala || Pan-STARRS ||  || align=right | 1.8 km || 
|-id=481 bgcolor=#E9E9E9
| 591481 ||  || — || October 9, 2013 || Kitt Peak || Spacewatch ||  || align=right data-sort-value="0.73" | 730 m || 
|-id=482 bgcolor=#E9E9E9
| 591482 ||  || — || October 6, 2013 || Kitt Peak || Spacewatch ||  || align=right | 1.6 km || 
|-id=483 bgcolor=#E9E9E9
| 591483 ||  || — || October 3, 2013 || Haleakala || Pan-STARRS ||  || align=right | 1.1 km || 
|-id=484 bgcolor=#E9E9E9
| 591484 ||  || — || October 3, 2013 || Kitt Peak || Spacewatch ||  || align=right | 1.2 km || 
|-id=485 bgcolor=#fefefe
| 591485 ||  || — || October 5, 2013 || Mayhill-ISON || L. Elenin ||  || align=right data-sort-value="0.70" | 700 m || 
|-id=486 bgcolor=#C2E0FF
| 591486 ||  || — || October 1, 2014 || Cerro Tololo-DECam ||  || plutinocritical || align=right | 94 km || 
|-id=487 bgcolor=#E9E9E9
| 591487 ||  || — || October 3, 2013 || Haleakala || Pan-STARRS ||  || align=right | 1.1 km || 
|-id=488 bgcolor=#FA8072
| 591488 ||  || — || December 31, 2008 || Kitt Peak || Spacewatch ||  || align=right data-sort-value="0.56" | 560 m || 
|-id=489 bgcolor=#E9E9E9
| 591489 ||  || — || October 30, 2013 || Elena Remote || A. Oreshko ||  || align=right | 1.2 km || 
|-id=490 bgcolor=#fefefe
| 591490 ||  || — || October 24, 2005 || Kitt Peak || Spacewatch || H || align=right data-sort-value="0.39" | 390 m || 
|-id=491 bgcolor=#E9E9E9
| 591491 ||  || — || November 17, 2009 || Mount Lemmon || Mount Lemmon Survey ||  || align=right data-sort-value="0.69" | 690 m || 
|-id=492 bgcolor=#E9E9E9
| 591492 ||  || — || October 16, 2013 || Mount Lemmon || Mount Lemmon Survey ||  || align=right | 1.6 km || 
|-id=493 bgcolor=#E9E9E9
| 591493 ||  || — || October 26, 2013 || Mount Lemmon || Mount Lemmon Survey ||  || align=right data-sort-value="0.80" | 800 m || 
|-id=494 bgcolor=#E9E9E9
| 591494 ||  || — || October 30, 2013 || Kitt Peak || Spacewatch ||  || align=right | 1.6 km || 
|-id=495 bgcolor=#E9E9E9
| 591495 ||  || — || October 23, 2013 || Haleakala || Pan-STARRS ||  || align=right data-sort-value="0.79" | 790 m || 
|-id=496 bgcolor=#E9E9E9
| 591496 ||  || — || October 25, 2013 || Mount Lemmon || Mount Lemmon Survey ||  || align=right data-sort-value="0.77" | 770 m || 
|-id=497 bgcolor=#E9E9E9
| 591497 ||  || — || October 28, 2013 || Mount Lemmon || Mount Lemmon Survey ||  || align=right data-sort-value="0.83" | 830 m || 
|-id=498 bgcolor=#E9E9E9
| 591498 ||  || — || October 26, 2013 || Mount Lemmon || Mount Lemmon Survey ||  || align=right | 1.6 km || 
|-id=499 bgcolor=#E9E9E9
| 591499 ||  || — || October 25, 2013 || Mount Lemmon || Mount Lemmon Survey ||  || align=right | 1.3 km || 
|-id=500 bgcolor=#E9E9E9
| 591500 ||  || — || October 28, 2013 || Catalina || CSS ||  || align=right data-sort-value="0.94" | 940 m || 
|}

591501–591600 

|-bgcolor=#E9E9E9
| 591501 ||  || — || October 24, 2013 || Mount Lemmon || Mount Lemmon Survey ||  || align=right data-sort-value="0.69" | 690 m || 
|-id=502 bgcolor=#E9E9E9
| 591502 ||  || — || October 28, 2013 || Mount Lemmon || Mount Lemmon Survey ||  || align=right data-sort-value="0.76" | 760 m || 
|-id=503 bgcolor=#fefefe
| 591503 ||  || — || May 14, 2012 || Haleakala || Pan-STARRS || H || align=right data-sort-value="0.64" | 640 m || 
|-id=504 bgcolor=#fefefe
| 591504 ||  || — || November 7, 2013 || Kitt Peak || Spacewatch || H || align=right data-sort-value="0.67" | 670 m || 
|-id=505 bgcolor=#E9E9E9
| 591505 ||  || — || October 12, 2013 || Kitt Peak || Spacewatch ||  || align=right data-sort-value="0.98" | 980 m || 
|-id=506 bgcolor=#E9E9E9
| 591506 ||  || — || April 1, 2003 || Kitt Peak || M. W. Buie, A. B. Jordan ||  || align=right | 1.7 km || 
|-id=507 bgcolor=#E9E9E9
| 591507 ||  || — || September 4, 2008 || Kitt Peak || Spacewatch ||  || align=right | 1.5 km || 
|-id=508 bgcolor=#E9E9E9
| 591508 ||  || — || February 27, 2006 || Catalina || CSS ||  || align=right | 1.5 km || 
|-id=509 bgcolor=#E9E9E9
| 591509 ||  || — || November 11, 2009 || Kitt Peak || Spacewatch ||  || align=right data-sort-value="0.68" | 680 m || 
|-id=510 bgcolor=#E9E9E9
| 591510 ||  || — || March 27, 1995 || Kitt Peak || Spacewatch ||  || align=right | 1.1 km || 
|-id=511 bgcolor=#E9E9E9
| 591511 ||  || — || November 2, 2013 || Mount Lemmon || Mount Lemmon Survey ||  || align=right data-sort-value="0.79" | 790 m || 
|-id=512 bgcolor=#E9E9E9
| 591512 ||  || — || November 2, 2013 || Mount Lemmon || Mount Lemmon Survey ||  || align=right | 1.1 km || 
|-id=513 bgcolor=#E9E9E9
| 591513 ||  || — || January 22, 2015 || Haleakala || Pan-STARRS ||  || align=right data-sort-value="0.92" | 920 m || 
|-id=514 bgcolor=#E9E9E9
| 591514 ||  || — || January 20, 2015 || Haleakala || Pan-STARRS ||  || align=right | 1.0 km || 
|-id=515 bgcolor=#E9E9E9
| 591515 ||  || — || November 12, 2013 || Mount Lemmon || Mount Lemmon Survey ||  || align=right | 1.1 km || 
|-id=516 bgcolor=#E9E9E9
| 591516 ||  || — || November 4, 2013 || Mount Lemmon || Mount Lemmon Survey ||  || align=right | 1.00 km || 
|-id=517 bgcolor=#E9E9E9
| 591517 ||  || — || November 9, 2013 || Haleakala || Pan-STARRS ||  || align=right | 1.5 km || 
|-id=518 bgcolor=#E9E9E9
| 591518 ||  || — || November 8, 2013 || Mount Lemmon || Mount Lemmon Survey ||  || align=right | 1.0 km || 
|-id=519 bgcolor=#E9E9E9
| 591519 ||  || — || September 13, 2004 || Kitt Peak || Spacewatch ||  || align=right | 1.1 km || 
|-id=520 bgcolor=#E9E9E9
| 591520 ||  || — || November 23, 2009 || Kitt Peak || Spacewatch ||  || align=right data-sort-value="0.72" | 720 m || 
|-id=521 bgcolor=#E9E9E9
| 591521 ||  || — || November 25, 2013 || Nogales || M. Schwartz, P. R. Holvorcem ||  || align=right data-sort-value="0.93" | 930 m || 
|-id=522 bgcolor=#E9E9E9
| 591522 ||  || — || December 1, 2005 || Kitt Peak || Spacewatch ||  || align=right | 1.0 km || 
|-id=523 bgcolor=#E9E9E9
| 591523 ||  || — || May 13, 2011 || Haleakala || Pan-STARRS ||  || align=right | 1.9 km || 
|-id=524 bgcolor=#E9E9E9
| 591524 ||  || — || September 28, 2000 || Kitt Peak || Spacewatch ||  || align=right | 1.4 km || 
|-id=525 bgcolor=#E9E9E9
| 591525 ||  || — || December 8, 2005 || Kitt Peak || Spacewatch ||  || align=right data-sort-value="0.68" | 680 m || 
|-id=526 bgcolor=#E9E9E9
| 591526 ||  || — || December 24, 2005 || Kitt Peak || Spacewatch ||  || align=right | 1.4 km || 
|-id=527 bgcolor=#E9E9E9
| 591527 ||  || — || November 27, 2013 || Haleakala || Pan-STARRS ||  || align=right | 1.3 km || 
|-id=528 bgcolor=#E9E9E9
| 591528 ||  || — || November 28, 2013 || Kitt Peak || Spacewatch ||  || align=right data-sort-value="0.90" | 900 m || 
|-id=529 bgcolor=#E9E9E9
| 591529 ||  || — || November 28, 2013 || Mount Lemmon || Mount Lemmon Survey ||  || align=right | 1.1 km || 
|-id=530 bgcolor=#fefefe
| 591530 ||  || — || November 13, 2002 || Palomar || NEAT || MAS || align=right data-sort-value="0.77" | 770 m || 
|-id=531 bgcolor=#E9E9E9
| 591531 ||  || — || March 13, 2011 || Kitt Peak || Spacewatch ||  || align=right | 2.4 km || 
|-id=532 bgcolor=#fefefe
| 591532 ||  || — || June 17, 2004 || Kitt Peak || Spacewatch || H || align=right data-sort-value="0.61" | 610 m || 
|-id=533 bgcolor=#E9E9E9
| 591533 ||  || — || January 22, 2002 || Kitt Peak || Spacewatch ||  || align=right data-sort-value="0.98" | 980 m || 
|-id=534 bgcolor=#E9E9E9
| 591534 ||  || — || January 27, 2006 || Kitt Peak || Spacewatch ||  || align=right | 1.2 km || 
|-id=535 bgcolor=#E9E9E9
| 591535 ||  || — || October 15, 2004 || Mount Lemmon || Mount Lemmon Survey || JUN || align=right | 1.3 km || 
|-id=536 bgcolor=#fefefe
| 591536 ||  || — || November 29, 2013 || Haleakala || Pan-STARRS || H || align=right data-sort-value="0.46" | 460 m || 
|-id=537 bgcolor=#E9E9E9
| 591537 ||  || — || October 8, 2004 || Kitt Peak || Spacewatch ||  || align=right | 1.2 km || 
|-id=538 bgcolor=#E9E9E9
| 591538 ||  || — || November 19, 2009 || Kitt Peak || Spacewatch ||  || align=right | 1.7 km || 
|-id=539 bgcolor=#E9E9E9
| 591539 ||  || — || November 26, 2013 || Haleakala || Pan-STARRS ||  || align=right | 1.1 km || 
|-id=540 bgcolor=#E9E9E9
| 591540 ||  || — || November 9, 2009 || Mount Lemmon || Mount Lemmon Survey ||  || align=right | 1.2 km || 
|-id=541 bgcolor=#E9E9E9
| 591541 ||  || — || August 7, 2004 || Palomar || NEAT ||  || align=right | 1.1 km || 
|-id=542 bgcolor=#E9E9E9
| 591542 ||  || — || November 10, 2009 || Kitt Peak || Spacewatch ||  || align=right data-sort-value="0.87" | 870 m || 
|-id=543 bgcolor=#E9E9E9
| 591543 ||  || — || April 4, 2002 || Palomar || NEAT ||  || align=right | 1.4 km || 
|-id=544 bgcolor=#E9E9E9
| 591544 ||  || — || December 19, 2001 || Palomar || NEAT ||  || align=right | 1.5 km || 
|-id=545 bgcolor=#E9E9E9
| 591545 ||  || — || November 8, 2013 || Kitt Peak || Spacewatch ||  || align=right | 1.6 km || 
|-id=546 bgcolor=#E9E9E9
| 591546 ||  || — || November 2, 2013 || Mount Lemmon || Mount Lemmon Survey ||  || align=right | 1.1 km || 
|-id=547 bgcolor=#E9E9E9
| 591547 ||  || — || May 12, 2012 || Haleakala || Pan-STARRS ||  || align=right data-sort-value="0.85" | 850 m || 
|-id=548 bgcolor=#E9E9E9
| 591548 ||  || — || November 18, 2009 || Kitt Peak || Spacewatch ||  || align=right data-sort-value="0.96" | 960 m || 
|-id=549 bgcolor=#fefefe
| 591549 ||  || — || May 15, 2012 || Mount Lemmon || Mount Lemmon Survey || H || align=right data-sort-value="0.48" | 480 m || 
|-id=550 bgcolor=#E9E9E9
| 591550 ||  || — || August 20, 2003 || Palomar || NEAT || EUN || align=right | 1.8 km || 
|-id=551 bgcolor=#E9E9E9
| 591551 ||  || — || May 12, 2007 || Mount Lemmon || Mount Lemmon Survey ||  || align=right | 1.5 km || 
|-id=552 bgcolor=#E9E9E9
| 591552 ||  || — || November 28, 2013 || Mount Lemmon || Mount Lemmon Survey ||  || align=right | 1.1 km || 
|-id=553 bgcolor=#E9E9E9
| 591553 ||  || — || December 29, 2014 || Haleakala || Pan-STARRS ||  || align=right | 1.2 km || 
|-id=554 bgcolor=#E9E9E9
| 591554 ||  || — || November 28, 2013 || Catalina || CSS ||  || align=right data-sort-value="0.75" | 750 m || 
|-id=555 bgcolor=#E9E9E9
| 591555 ||  || — || November 12, 2013 || Mount Lemmon || Mount Lemmon Survey ||  || align=right | 1.0 km || 
|-id=556 bgcolor=#E9E9E9
| 591556 ||  || — || November 28, 2013 || Mount Lemmon || Mount Lemmon Survey ||  || align=right | 1.8 km || 
|-id=557 bgcolor=#E9E9E9
| 591557 ||  || — || May 3, 2016 || Haleakala || Pan-STARRS ||  || align=right | 1.2 km || 
|-id=558 bgcolor=#E9E9E9
| 591558 ||  || — || November 26, 2013 || Mount Lemmon || Mount Lemmon Survey ||  || align=right data-sort-value="0.83" | 830 m || 
|-id=559 bgcolor=#E9E9E9
| 591559 ||  || — || November 28, 2013 || Mount Lemmon || Mount Lemmon Survey ||  || align=right | 1.5 km || 
|-id=560 bgcolor=#E9E9E9
| 591560 ||  || — || October 15, 2004 || Kitt Peak || Spacewatch ||  || align=right | 1.5 km || 
|-id=561 bgcolor=#E9E9E9
| 591561 ||  || — || July 29, 2000 || Cerro Tololo || M. W. Buie, S. D. Kern ||  || align=right | 1.00 km || 
|-id=562 bgcolor=#fefefe
| 591562 ||  || — || June 8, 2012 || Mount Lemmon || Mount Lemmon Survey || H || align=right data-sort-value="0.82" | 820 m || 
|-id=563 bgcolor=#E9E9E9
| 591563 ||  || — || November 11, 2013 || Mount Lemmon || Mount Lemmon Survey ||  || align=right | 1.8 km || 
|-id=564 bgcolor=#E9E9E9
| 591564 ||  || — || November 27, 2013 || Mayhill-ISON || L. Elenin ||  || align=right | 1.5 km || 
|-id=565 bgcolor=#E9E9E9
| 591565 ||  || — || November 6, 2013 || Nogales || M. Schwartz, P. R. Holvorcem ||  || align=right | 1.1 km || 
|-id=566 bgcolor=#fefefe
| 591566 ||  || — || November 29, 2013 || Palomar || PTF || H || align=right data-sort-value="0.64" | 640 m || 
|-id=567 bgcolor=#E9E9E9
| 591567 ||  || — || February 17, 2010 || Mount Lemmon || Mount Lemmon Survey ||  || align=right | 1.0 km || 
|-id=568 bgcolor=#E9E9E9
| 591568 ||  || — || October 29, 2008 || Mount Lemmon || Mount Lemmon Survey ||  || align=right | 2.0 km || 
|-id=569 bgcolor=#E9E9E9
| 591569 ||  || — || November 29, 2013 || Kitt Peak || Spacewatch ||  || align=right | 1.5 km || 
|-id=570 bgcolor=#E9E9E9
| 591570 ||  || — || December 3, 2013 || Mount Lemmon || Mount Lemmon Survey ||  || align=right | 1.2 km || 
|-id=571 bgcolor=#E9E9E9
| 591571 ||  || — || August 4, 2017 || Haleakala || Pan-STARRS ||  || align=right | 1.2 km || 
|-id=572 bgcolor=#E9E9E9
| 591572 ||  || — || March 10, 2011 || Kitt Peak || Spacewatch ||  || align=right | 2.0 km || 
|-id=573 bgcolor=#E9E9E9
| 591573 ||  || — || December 13, 2013 || Mount Lemmon || Mount Lemmon Survey ||  || align=right | 1.3 km || 
|-id=574 bgcolor=#E9E9E9
| 591574 ||  || — || November 3, 2008 || Mount Lemmon || Mount Lemmon Survey ||  || align=right | 1.9 km || 
|-id=575 bgcolor=#E9E9E9
| 591575 ||  || — || February 17, 2010 || Mount Lemmon || Mount Lemmon Survey ||  || align=right data-sort-value="0.86" | 860 m || 
|-id=576 bgcolor=#E9E9E9
| 591576 ||  || — || December 9, 2013 || XuYi || PMO NEO ||  || align=right | 2.1 km || 
|-id=577 bgcolor=#E9E9E9
| 591577 ||  || — || October 7, 2004 || Socorro || LINEAR ||  || align=right | 1.3 km || 
|-id=578 bgcolor=#E9E9E9
| 591578 ||  || — || December 24, 2013 || Mount Lemmon || Mount Lemmon Survey ||  || align=right data-sort-value="0.97" | 970 m || 
|-id=579 bgcolor=#fefefe
| 591579 ||  || — || February 23, 2007 || Mount Lemmon || Mount Lemmon Survey ||  || align=right data-sort-value="0.55" | 550 m || 
|-id=580 bgcolor=#E9E9E9
| 591580 ||  || — || August 20, 2000 || Kitt Peak || Spacewatch ||  || align=right data-sort-value="0.80" | 800 m || 
|-id=581 bgcolor=#E9E9E9
| 591581 ||  || — || September 7, 2008 || Catalina || CSS ||  || align=right | 1.5 km || 
|-id=582 bgcolor=#E9E9E9
| 591582 ||  || — || February 10, 2010 || Kitt Peak || Spacewatch ||  || align=right | 1.2 km || 
|-id=583 bgcolor=#d6d6d6
| 591583 ||  || — || January 31, 2009 || Kitt Peak || Spacewatch ||  || align=right | 2.2 km || 
|-id=584 bgcolor=#fefefe
| 591584 ||  || — || September 25, 2009 || Kitt Peak || Spacewatch || MAS || align=right data-sort-value="0.68" | 680 m || 
|-id=585 bgcolor=#E9E9E9
| 591585 ||  || — || June 16, 2012 || Haleakala || Pan-STARRS ||  || align=right | 1.3 km || 
|-id=586 bgcolor=#E9E9E9
| 591586 ||  || — || August 15, 2004 || Siding Spring || SSS ||  || align=right | 1.6 km || 
|-id=587 bgcolor=#E9E9E9
| 591587 ||  || — || January 6, 2006 || Mount Lemmon || Mount Lemmon Survey ||  || align=right data-sort-value="0.77" | 770 m || 
|-id=588 bgcolor=#E9E9E9
| 591588 ||  || — || December 25, 2013 || Mount Lemmon || Mount Lemmon Survey ||  || align=right | 1.7 km || 
|-id=589 bgcolor=#fefefe
| 591589 ||  || — || March 8, 2003 || Socorro || LINEAR || NYS || align=right data-sort-value="0.79" | 790 m || 
|-id=590 bgcolor=#E9E9E9
| 591590 ||  || — || December 9, 2004 || Kitt Peak || Spacewatch ||  || align=right | 1.7 km || 
|-id=591 bgcolor=#E9E9E9
| 591591 ||  || — || January 25, 2006 || Kitt Peak || Spacewatch ||  || align=right data-sort-value="0.97" | 970 m || 
|-id=592 bgcolor=#E9E9E9
| 591592 ||  || — || December 3, 2013 || Oukaimeden || M. Ory ||  || align=right | 1.6 km || 
|-id=593 bgcolor=#E9E9E9
| 591593 ||  || — || February 18, 2010 || Mount Lemmon || Mount Lemmon Survey ||  || align=right | 1.5 km || 
|-id=594 bgcolor=#E9E9E9
| 591594 ||  || — || December 24, 2013 || Mount Lemmon || Mount Lemmon Survey ||  || align=right | 2.0 km || 
|-id=595 bgcolor=#E9E9E9
| 591595 ||  || — || September 23, 2008 || Mount Lemmon || Mount Lemmon Survey ||  || align=right | 1.5 km || 
|-id=596 bgcolor=#E9E9E9
| 591596 ||  || — || September 18, 2003 || Palomar || NEAT ||  || align=right | 2.7 km || 
|-id=597 bgcolor=#E9E9E9
| 591597 ||  || — || December 10, 2013 || Mount Lemmon || Mount Lemmon Survey ||  || align=right data-sort-value="0.74" | 740 m || 
|-id=598 bgcolor=#E9E9E9
| 591598 ||  || — || December 25, 2005 || Kitt Peak || Spacewatch ||  || align=right data-sort-value="0.97" | 970 m || 
|-id=599 bgcolor=#E9E9E9
| 591599 ||  || — || December 4, 2013 || Haleakala || Pan-STARRS ||  || align=right | 1.4 km || 
|-id=600 bgcolor=#E9E9E9
| 591600 ||  || — || December 28, 2013 || Kitt Peak || Spacewatch ||  || align=right | 1.8 km || 
|}

591601–591700 

|-bgcolor=#E9E9E9
| 591601 ||  || — || November 30, 2008 || Mount Lemmon || Mount Lemmon Survey ||  || align=right | 1.7 km || 
|-id=602 bgcolor=#E9E9E9
| 591602 ||  || — || March 3, 2005 || Catalina || CSS ||  || align=right | 3.0 km || 
|-id=603 bgcolor=#d6d6d6
| 591603 ||  || — || January 19, 2004 || Kitt Peak || Spacewatch ||  || align=right | 2.0 km || 
|-id=604 bgcolor=#E9E9E9
| 591604 ||  || — || December 10, 2013 || Mount Lemmon || Mount Lemmon Survey ||  || align=right | 1.6 km || 
|-id=605 bgcolor=#E9E9E9
| 591605 ||  || — || August 14, 2012 || Haleakala || Pan-STARRS ||  || align=right | 2.1 km || 
|-id=606 bgcolor=#E9E9E9
| 591606 ||  || — || October 22, 2008 || Kitt Peak || Spacewatch ||  || align=right | 1.8 km || 
|-id=607 bgcolor=#E9E9E9
| 591607 ||  || — || November 6, 2008 || Kitt Peak || Spacewatch ||  || align=right | 1.9 km || 
|-id=608 bgcolor=#E9E9E9
| 591608 ||  || — || November 8, 2008 || Kitt Peak || Spacewatch ||  || align=right | 1.6 km || 
|-id=609 bgcolor=#E9E9E9
| 591609 ||  || — || October 22, 2008 || Kitt Peak || Spacewatch ||  || align=right | 1.3 km || 
|-id=610 bgcolor=#E9E9E9
| 591610 ||  || — || December 28, 2013 || Kitt Peak || Spacewatch ||  || align=right | 1.4 km || 
|-id=611 bgcolor=#E9E9E9
| 591611 ||  || — || December 28, 2013 || Kitt Peak || Spacewatch ||  || align=right | 1.9 km || 
|-id=612 bgcolor=#E9E9E9
| 591612 ||  || — || October 9, 2004 || Kitt Peak || Spacewatch ||  || align=right | 1.4 km || 
|-id=613 bgcolor=#E9E9E9
| 591613 ||  || — || January 16, 2005 || Kitt Peak || Spacewatch ||  || align=right | 1.6 km || 
|-id=614 bgcolor=#E9E9E9
| 591614 ||  || — || December 11, 2013 || Mount Lemmon || Mount Lemmon Survey ||  || align=right | 2.0 km || 
|-id=615 bgcolor=#E9E9E9
| 591615 ||  || — || May 13, 2002 || Palomar || NEAT ||  || align=right | 2.5 km || 
|-id=616 bgcolor=#E9E9E9
| 591616 ||  || — || December 10, 2013 || Mount Lemmon || Mount Lemmon Survey ||  || align=right | 1.3 km || 
|-id=617 bgcolor=#E9E9E9
| 591617 ||  || — || September 3, 2008 || La Sagra || OAM Obs. ||  || align=right | 1.1 km || 
|-id=618 bgcolor=#E9E9E9
| 591618 ||  || — || December 28, 2013 || Mount Lemmon || Mount Lemmon Survey ||  || align=right | 1.7 km || 
|-id=619 bgcolor=#E9E9E9
| 591619 ||  || — || December 30, 2013 || Haleakala || Pan-STARRS ||  || align=right | 1.9 km || 
|-id=620 bgcolor=#E9E9E9
| 591620 ||  || — || November 29, 2013 || Kitt Peak || Spacewatch ||  || align=right | 1.5 km || 
|-id=621 bgcolor=#E9E9E9
| 591621 ||  || — || December 29, 2013 || Haleakala || Pan-STARRS ||  || align=right | 1.5 km || 
|-id=622 bgcolor=#E9E9E9
| 591622 ||  || — || March 13, 2010 || Mount Lemmon || Mount Lemmon Survey ||  || align=right | 1.6 km || 
|-id=623 bgcolor=#E9E9E9
| 591623 ||  || — || September 9, 2012 || Bergisch Gladbach || W. Bickel ||  || align=right | 1.5 km || 
|-id=624 bgcolor=#E9E9E9
| 591624 ||  || — || February 6, 1997 || Kitt Peak || Spacewatch ||  || align=right | 1.4 km || 
|-id=625 bgcolor=#E9E9E9
| 591625 ||  || — || July 22, 2011 || Haleakala || Pan-STARRS ||  || align=right | 2.8 km || 
|-id=626 bgcolor=#E9E9E9
| 591626 ||  || — || December 7, 2013 || Kitt Peak || Spacewatch ||  || align=right | 1.3 km || 
|-id=627 bgcolor=#E9E9E9
| 591627 ||  || — || December 26, 2013 || Mount Lemmon || Mount Lemmon Survey ||  || align=right | 1.00 km || 
|-id=628 bgcolor=#E9E9E9
| 591628 ||  || — || December 30, 2013 || Haleakala || Pan-STARRS ||  || align=right | 1.6 km || 
|-id=629 bgcolor=#E9E9E9
| 591629 ||  || — || December 30, 2013 || Haleakala || Pan-STARRS ||  || align=right | 1.3 km || 
|-id=630 bgcolor=#E9E9E9
| 591630 ||  || — || November 28, 2013 || Mount Lemmon || Mount Lemmon Survey ||  || align=right | 1.2 km || 
|-id=631 bgcolor=#E9E9E9
| 591631 ||  || — || January 19, 2005 || Kitt Peak || Spacewatch ||  || align=right | 2.1 km || 
|-id=632 bgcolor=#E9E9E9
| 591632 ||  || — || December 31, 2013 || Haleakala || Pan-STARRS ||  || align=right | 1.9 km || 
|-id=633 bgcolor=#E9E9E9
| 591633 ||  || — || December 4, 2008 || Kitt Peak || Spacewatch ||  || align=right | 2.2 km || 
|-id=634 bgcolor=#E9E9E9
| 591634 ||  || — || November 1, 2008 || Mount Lemmon || Mount Lemmon Survey ||  || align=right | 2.3 km || 
|-id=635 bgcolor=#E9E9E9
| 591635 ||  || — || November 20, 2008 || Kitt Peak || Spacewatch ||  || align=right | 2.2 km || 
|-id=636 bgcolor=#E9E9E9
| 591636 ||  || — || December 31, 2013 || Mount Lemmon || Mount Lemmon Survey ||  || align=right | 1.6 km || 
|-id=637 bgcolor=#d6d6d6
| 591637 ||  || — || December 30, 2008 || Mount Lemmon || Mount Lemmon Survey ||  || align=right | 2.7 km || 
|-id=638 bgcolor=#E9E9E9
| 591638 ||  || — || November 1, 2008 || Mount Lemmon || Mount Lemmon Survey ||  || align=right | 2.1 km || 
|-id=639 bgcolor=#E9E9E9
| 591639 ||  || — || December 31, 2013 || Mayhill-ISON || L. Elenin ||  || align=right | 1.1 km || 
|-id=640 bgcolor=#E9E9E9
| 591640 ||  || — || October 17, 2013 || Haleakala || Pan-STARRS ||  || align=right | 1.0 km || 
|-id=641 bgcolor=#E9E9E9
| 591641 ||  || — || September 6, 2012 || Mount Lemmon || Mount Lemmon Survey ||  || align=right | 1.2 km || 
|-id=642 bgcolor=#E9E9E9
| 591642 ||  || — || November 6, 2013 || Mount Lemmon || Mount Lemmon Survey ||  || align=right | 1.6 km || 
|-id=643 bgcolor=#E9E9E9
| 591643 ||  || — || January 1, 2014 || Haleakala || Pan-STARRS ||  || align=right | 2.1 km || 
|-id=644 bgcolor=#E9E9E9
| 591644 ||  || — || November 26, 2013 || Mount Lemmon || Mount Lemmon Survey ||  || align=right | 1.4 km || 
|-id=645 bgcolor=#E9E9E9
| 591645 ||  || — || February 10, 2002 || Socorro || LINEAR ||  || align=right | 1.1 km || 
|-id=646 bgcolor=#E9E9E9
| 591646 ||  || — || January 1, 2014 || Haleakala || Pan-STARRS ||  || align=right | 1.6 km || 
|-id=647 bgcolor=#E9E9E9
| 591647 ||  || — || November 25, 2013 || Nogales || M. Schwartz, P. R. Holvorcem ||  || align=right | 2.0 km || 
|-id=648 bgcolor=#E9E9E9
| 591648 ||  || — || December 7, 2005 || Kitt Peak || Spacewatch ||  || align=right | 1.0 km || 
|-id=649 bgcolor=#E9E9E9
| 591649 ||  || — || November 23, 2000 || Haleakala || AMOS || MAR || align=right | 1.3 km || 
|-id=650 bgcolor=#d6d6d6
| 591650 ||  || — || October 10, 2012 || Mount Lemmon || Mount Lemmon Survey ||  || align=right | 1.9 km || 
|-id=651 bgcolor=#E9E9E9
| 591651 ||  || — || January 3, 2014 || Kitt Peak || Spacewatch ||  || align=right | 1.9 km || 
|-id=652 bgcolor=#E9E9E9
| 591652 ||  || — || January 3, 2014 || Kitt Peak || Spacewatch ||  || align=right | 1.8 km || 
|-id=653 bgcolor=#E9E9E9
| 591653 ||  || — || January 3, 2014 || Charleston || R. Holmes ||  || align=right data-sort-value="0.82" | 820 m || 
|-id=654 bgcolor=#E9E9E9
| 591654 ||  || — || November 1, 2008 || Kitt Peak || Spacewatch ||  || align=right | 2.4 km || 
|-id=655 bgcolor=#d6d6d6
| 591655 ||  || — || March 13, 2010 || Kitt Peak || Spacewatch ||  || align=right | 1.7 km || 
|-id=656 bgcolor=#E9E9E9
| 591656 ||  || — || September 25, 1998 || Apache Point || SDSS Collaboration ||  || align=right | 1.6 km || 
|-id=657 bgcolor=#E9E9E9
| 591657 ||  || — || February 4, 2005 || Kitt Peak || Spacewatch ||  || align=right | 1.7 km || 
|-id=658 bgcolor=#E9E9E9
| 591658 ||  || — || September 15, 2012 || Catalina || CSS ||  || align=right | 2.5 km || 
|-id=659 bgcolor=#E9E9E9
| 591659 ||  || — || January 10, 2014 || Kitt Peak || Spacewatch ||  || align=right | 1.6 km || 
|-id=660 bgcolor=#E9E9E9
| 591660 ||  || — || January 2, 2014 || Mount Lemmon || Mount Lemmon Survey ||  || align=right | 1.7 km || 
|-id=661 bgcolor=#E9E9E9
| 591661 ||  || — || October 7, 2012 || Haleakala || Pan-STARRS ||  || align=right | 2.0 km || 
|-id=662 bgcolor=#E9E9E9
| 591662 ||  || — || November 27, 2000 || Desert Beaver || B. Yeung ||  || align=right data-sort-value="0.89" | 890 m || 
|-id=663 bgcolor=#E9E9E9
| 591663 ||  || — || December 31, 2013 || Haleakala || Pan-STARRS ||  || align=right | 1.8 km || 
|-id=664 bgcolor=#E9E9E9
| 591664 ||  || — || January 21, 2014 || Mount Lemmon || Mount Lemmon Survey ||  || align=right | 1.6 km || 
|-id=665 bgcolor=#E9E9E9
| 591665 ||  || — || December 31, 2013 || Kitt Peak || Spacewatch ||  || align=right | 2.3 km || 
|-id=666 bgcolor=#E9E9E9
| 591666 ||  || — || April 26, 2007 || Mount Lemmon || Mount Lemmon Survey ||  || align=right | 1.8 km || 
|-id=667 bgcolor=#E9E9E9
| 591667 ||  || — || February 4, 2005 || Kitt Peak || Spacewatch ||  || align=right | 1.7 km || 
|-id=668 bgcolor=#fefefe
| 591668 ||  || — || May 13, 2005 || Mount Lemmon || Mount Lemmon Survey ||  || align=right data-sort-value="0.62" | 620 m || 
|-id=669 bgcolor=#d6d6d6
| 591669 ||  || — || October 16, 2012 || Mount Lemmon || Mount Lemmon Survey ||  || align=right | 1.8 km || 
|-id=670 bgcolor=#E9E9E9
| 591670 ||  || — || March 10, 2005 || Mount Lemmon || Mount Lemmon Survey ||  || align=right | 2.0 km || 
|-id=671 bgcolor=#E9E9E9
| 591671 ||  || — || March 9, 2005 || Mount Lemmon || Mount Lemmon Survey ||  || align=right | 2.2 km || 
|-id=672 bgcolor=#d6d6d6
| 591672 ||  || — || January 16, 2009 || Kitt Peak || Spacewatch ||  || align=right | 2.0 km || 
|-id=673 bgcolor=#E9E9E9
| 591673 ||  || — || October 7, 2012 || Haleakala || Pan-STARRS ||  || align=right | 1.6 km || 
|-id=674 bgcolor=#E9E9E9
| 591674 ||  || — || October 17, 2012 || Haleakala || Pan-STARRS ||  || align=right | 1.9 km || 
|-id=675 bgcolor=#E9E9E9
| 591675 ||  || — || October 5, 2012 || Haleakala || Pan-STARRS ||  || align=right | 1.8 km || 
|-id=676 bgcolor=#d6d6d6
| 591676 ||  || — || October 20, 2007 || Mount Lemmon || Mount Lemmon Survey ||  || align=right | 2.4 km || 
|-id=677 bgcolor=#E9E9E9
| 591677 ||  || — || October 10, 2013 || Haleakala || Pan-STARRS ||  || align=right | 1.5 km || 
|-id=678 bgcolor=#d6d6d6
| 591678 ||  || — || January 29, 2014 || Kitt Peak || Spacewatch ||  || align=right | 2.3 km || 
|-id=679 bgcolor=#E9E9E9
| 591679 ||  || — || March 16, 2005 || Mount Lemmon || Mount Lemmon Survey ||  || align=right | 2.0 km || 
|-id=680 bgcolor=#E9E9E9
| 591680 ||  || — || January 26, 2014 || Haleakala || Pan-STARRS ||  || align=right data-sort-value="0.95" | 950 m || 
|-id=681 bgcolor=#E9E9E9
| 591681 ||  || — || October 9, 2012 || Mount Lemmon || Mount Lemmon Survey ||  || align=right | 1.7 km || 
|-id=682 bgcolor=#d6d6d6
| 591682 ||  || — || March 27, 2009 || Catalina || CSS ||  || align=right | 2.3 km || 
|-id=683 bgcolor=#C2FFFF
| 591683 ||  || — || February 18, 2013 || Mount Lemmon || Mount Lemmon Survey || L4 || align=right | 6.7 km || 
|-id=684 bgcolor=#E9E9E9
| 591684 ||  || — || January 26, 2014 || Haleakala || Pan-STARRS ||  || align=right | 1.8 km || 
|-id=685 bgcolor=#E9E9E9
| 591685 ||  || — || February 4, 2014 || Elena Remote || A. Oreshko ||  || align=right | 1.8 km || 
|-id=686 bgcolor=#E9E9E9
| 591686 ||  || — || October 20, 2003 || Kitt Peak || Spacewatch ||  || align=right | 2.6 km || 
|-id=687 bgcolor=#E9E9E9
| 591687 ||  || — || January 10, 2014 || Mount Lemmon || Mount Lemmon Survey ||  || align=right | 1.6 km || 
|-id=688 bgcolor=#E9E9E9
| 591688 ||  || — || February 5, 2014 || Kitt Peak || Spacewatch ||  || align=right | 1.8 km || 
|-id=689 bgcolor=#E9E9E9
| 591689 ||  || — || October 26, 2008 || Kitt Peak || Spacewatch ||  || align=right | 1.5 km || 
|-id=690 bgcolor=#E9E9E9
| 591690 ||  || — || September 18, 2003 || Kitt Peak || Spacewatch ||  || align=right | 1.6 km || 
|-id=691 bgcolor=#E9E9E9
| 591691 ||  || — || August 28, 2003 || Palomar || NEAT || EUN || align=right | 1.7 km || 
|-id=692 bgcolor=#C2FFFF
| 591692 ||  || — || March 21, 2015 || Haleakala || Pan-STARRS || L4 || align=right | 8.5 km || 
|-id=693 bgcolor=#C2FFFF
| 591693 ||  || — || January 4, 2013 || Cerro Tololo-DECam || CTIO-DECam || L4 || align=right | 7.6 km || 
|-id=694 bgcolor=#E9E9E9
| 591694 ||  || — || February 6, 2014 || Mount Lemmon || Mount Lemmon Survey ||  || align=right | 1.3 km || 
|-id=695 bgcolor=#d6d6d6
| 591695 ||  || — || January 1, 2014 || Mount Lemmon || Mount Lemmon Survey ||  || align=right | 2.8 km || 
|-id=696 bgcolor=#d6d6d6
| 591696 ||  || — || March 12, 2005 || Kitt Peak || M. W. Buie, L. H. Wasserman || KOR || align=right | 1.3 km || 
|-id=697 bgcolor=#E9E9E9
| 591697 ||  || — || February 21, 2014 || Mayhill-ISON || L. Elenin ||  || align=right | 2.0 km || 
|-id=698 bgcolor=#E9E9E9
| 591698 ||  || — || October 23, 2003 || Kitt Peak || L. H. Wasserman, D. E. Trilling ||  || align=right | 2.3 km || 
|-id=699 bgcolor=#fefefe
| 591699 ||  || — || September 29, 2009 || Mount Lemmon || Mount Lemmon Survey ||  || align=right data-sort-value="0.81" | 810 m || 
|-id=700 bgcolor=#d6d6d6
| 591700 ||  || — || September 29, 2001 || Palomar || NEAT ||  || align=right | 3.6 km || 
|}

591701–591800 

|-bgcolor=#E9E9E9
| 591701 ||  || — || September 19, 2003 || Palomar || NEAT ||  || align=right | 1.6 km || 
|-id=702 bgcolor=#fefefe
| 591702 ||  || — || February 13, 2007 || Mount Lemmon || Mount Lemmon Survey ||  || align=right data-sort-value="0.68" | 680 m || 
|-id=703 bgcolor=#d6d6d6
| 591703 ||  || — || April 5, 2003 || Kitt Peak || Spacewatch ||  || align=right | 2.2 km || 
|-id=704 bgcolor=#E9E9E9
| 591704 ||  || — || October 21, 2012 || Haleakala || Pan-STARRS ||  || align=right | 1.8 km || 
|-id=705 bgcolor=#d6d6d6
| 591705 ||  || — || September 12, 2001 || Kitt Peak || L. H. Wasserman, E. L. Ryan ||  || align=right | 2.6 km || 
|-id=706 bgcolor=#d6d6d6
| 591706 ||  || — || November 17, 2007 || Kitt Peak || Spacewatch ||  || align=right | 1.9 km || 
|-id=707 bgcolor=#d6d6d6
| 591707 ||  || — || September 20, 2006 || Kitt Peak || Spacewatch ||  || align=right | 2.7 km || 
|-id=708 bgcolor=#fefefe
| 591708 ||  || — || January 7, 2010 || Mount Lemmon || Mount Lemmon Survey ||  || align=right data-sort-value="0.81" | 810 m || 
|-id=709 bgcolor=#E9E9E9
| 591709 ||  || — || October 17, 2012 || Haleakala || Pan-STARRS ||  || align=right | 2.0 km || 
|-id=710 bgcolor=#E9E9E9
| 591710 ||  || — || September 22, 2012 || Mount Lemmon || Mount Lemmon Survey ||  || align=right | 1.2 km || 
|-id=711 bgcolor=#E9E9E9
| 591711 ||  || — || September 23, 2008 || Kitt Peak || Spacewatch ||  || align=right | 1.1 km || 
|-id=712 bgcolor=#d6d6d6
| 591712 ||  || — || February 27, 2014 || Kitt Peak || Spacewatch ||  || align=right | 2.6 km || 
|-id=713 bgcolor=#C2FFFF
| 591713 ||  || — || September 15, 2009 || Kitt Peak || Spacewatch || L4 || align=right | 7.4 km || 
|-id=714 bgcolor=#C2FFFF
| 591714 ||  || — || September 23, 2008 || Mount Lemmon || Mount Lemmon Survey || L4 || align=right | 7.3 km || 
|-id=715 bgcolor=#d6d6d6
| 591715 ||  || — || November 5, 2007 || Kitt Peak || Spacewatch ||  || align=right | 2.3 km || 
|-id=716 bgcolor=#d6d6d6
| 591716 ||  || — || September 7, 2011 || Kitt Peak || Spacewatch ||  || align=right | 2.0 km || 
|-id=717 bgcolor=#E9E9E9
| 591717 ||  || — || September 26, 2003 || Apache Point || SDSS Collaboration ||  || align=right | 1.7 km || 
|-id=718 bgcolor=#d6d6d6
| 591718 ||  || — || February 26, 2014 || Haleakala || Pan-STARRS ||  || align=right | 2.1 km || 
|-id=719 bgcolor=#d6d6d6
| 591719 ||  || — || September 23, 2011 || Haleakala || Pan-STARRS ||  || align=right | 2.4 km || 
|-id=720 bgcolor=#E9E9E9
| 591720 ||  || — || October 16, 2012 || Kitt Peak || Spacewatch ||  || align=right | 1.3 km || 
|-id=721 bgcolor=#d6d6d6
| 591721 ||  || — || February 26, 2014 || Haleakala || Pan-STARRS ||  || align=right | 1.9 km || 
|-id=722 bgcolor=#d6d6d6
| 591722 ||  || — || January 10, 2008 || Mount Lemmon || Mount Lemmon Survey ||  || align=right | 2.3 km || 
|-id=723 bgcolor=#C2FFFF
| 591723 ||  || — || February 26, 2014 || Haleakala || Pan-STARRS || L4 || align=right | 6.5 km || 
|-id=724 bgcolor=#E9E9E9
| 591724 ||  || — || February 26, 2014 || Haleakala || Pan-STARRS ||  || align=right | 1.4 km || 
|-id=725 bgcolor=#d6d6d6
| 591725 ||  || — || February 26, 2014 || Haleakala || Pan-STARRS ||  || align=right | 2.0 km || 
|-id=726 bgcolor=#E9E9E9
| 591726 ||  || — || February 26, 2014 || Haleakala || Pan-STARRS ||  || align=right | 2.1 km || 
|-id=727 bgcolor=#d6d6d6
| 591727 ||  || — || December 1, 2006 || Mount Lemmon || Mount Lemmon Survey ||  || align=right | 3.0 km || 
|-id=728 bgcolor=#d6d6d6
| 591728 ||  || — || February 26, 2014 || Mount Lemmon || Mount Lemmon Survey ||  || align=right | 1.7 km || 
|-id=729 bgcolor=#d6d6d6
| 591729 ||  || — || August 21, 2001 || Kitt Peak || Spacewatch || EOS || align=right | 1.6 km || 
|-id=730 bgcolor=#C2FFFF
| 591730 ||  || — || October 11, 2010 || Mount Lemmon || Mount Lemmon Survey || L4 || align=right | 6.4 km || 
|-id=731 bgcolor=#d6d6d6
| 591731 ||  || — || February 26, 2009 || Kitt Peak || Spacewatch ||  || align=right | 2.0 km || 
|-id=732 bgcolor=#d6d6d6
| 591732 ||  || — || February 27, 2014 || Kitt Peak || Spacewatch ||  || align=right | 2.2 km || 
|-id=733 bgcolor=#C2FFFF
| 591733 ||  || — || January 23, 2014 || Mount Lemmon || Mount Lemmon Survey || L4 || align=right | 7.3 km || 
|-id=734 bgcolor=#d6d6d6
| 591734 ||  || — || February 28, 2014 || Haleakala || Pan-STARRS ||  || align=right | 2.3 km || 
|-id=735 bgcolor=#E9E9E9
| 591735 ||  || — || March 8, 2005 || Anderson Mesa || LONEOS ||  || align=right | 1.8 km || 
|-id=736 bgcolor=#C2FFFF
| 591736 ||  || — || October 12, 2010 || Mount Lemmon || Mount Lemmon Survey || L4 || align=right | 7.4 km || 
|-id=737 bgcolor=#d6d6d6
| 591737 ||  || — || March 29, 2004 || Kitt Peak || Spacewatch ||  || align=right | 2.2 km || 
|-id=738 bgcolor=#C2FFFF
| 591738 ||  || — || February 28, 2014 || Haleakala || Pan-STARRS || L4 || align=right | 6.1 km || 
|-id=739 bgcolor=#d6d6d6
| 591739 ||  || — || November 14, 2007 || Kitt Peak || Spacewatch ||  || align=right | 2.2 km || 
|-id=740 bgcolor=#E9E9E9
| 591740 ||  || — || August 29, 2002 || Kitt Peak || Spacewatch ||  || align=right | 2.3 km || 
|-id=741 bgcolor=#C2FFFF
| 591741 ||  || — || March 5, 2002 || Kitt Peak || Spacewatch || L4 || align=right | 9.5 km || 
|-id=742 bgcolor=#FA8072
| 591742 ||  || — || November 30, 2003 || Socorro || LINEAR ||  || align=right data-sort-value="0.77" | 770 m || 
|-id=743 bgcolor=#d6d6d6
| 591743 ||  || — || February 26, 2014 || Haleakala || Pan-STARRS ||  || align=right | 1.8 km || 
|-id=744 bgcolor=#E9E9E9
| 591744 ||  || — || October 8, 2012 || Haleakala || Pan-STARRS ||  || align=right | 1.7 km || 
|-id=745 bgcolor=#d6d6d6
| 591745 ||  || — || February 26, 2014 || Mount Lemmon || Mount Lemmon Survey ||  || align=right | 2.5 km || 
|-id=746 bgcolor=#E9E9E9
| 591746 ||  || — || February 11, 2004 || Kitt Peak || Spacewatch ||  || align=right | 2.1 km || 
|-id=747 bgcolor=#d6d6d6
| 591747 ||  || — || September 24, 2011 || Haleakala || Pan-STARRS ||  || align=right | 2.1 km || 
|-id=748 bgcolor=#d6d6d6
| 591748 ||  || — || November 12, 2001 || Apache Point || SDSS Collaboration ||  || align=right | 2.4 km || 
|-id=749 bgcolor=#d6d6d6
| 591749 ||  || — || May 25, 2015 || Haleakala || Pan-STARRS ||  || align=right | 1.8 km || 
|-id=750 bgcolor=#d6d6d6
| 591750 ||  || — || June 13, 2015 || Haleakala || Pan-STARRS ||  || align=right | 2.1 km || 
|-id=751 bgcolor=#d6d6d6
| 591751 ||  || — || February 27, 2014 || Haleakala || Pan-STARRS ||  || align=right | 2.2 km || 
|-id=752 bgcolor=#d6d6d6
| 591752 ||  || — || February 28, 2014 || Haleakala || Pan-STARRS ||  || align=right | 1.9 km || 
|-id=753 bgcolor=#d6d6d6
| 591753 ||  || — || February 28, 2014 || Haleakala || Pan-STARRS ||  || align=right | 2.1 km || 
|-id=754 bgcolor=#C2FFFF
| 591754 ||  || — || February 24, 2014 || Haleakala || Pan-STARRS || L4 || align=right | 6.6 km || 
|-id=755 bgcolor=#d6d6d6
| 591755 ||  || — || February 26, 2014 || Haleakala || Pan-STARRS ||  || align=right | 2.7 km || 
|-id=756 bgcolor=#C2FFFF
| 591756 ||  || — || February 24, 2014 || Haleakala || Pan-STARRS || L4 || align=right | 8.1 km || 
|-id=757 bgcolor=#C2FFFF
| 591757 ||  || — || February 28, 2014 || Haleakala || Pan-STARRS || L4 || align=right | 7.7 km || 
|-id=758 bgcolor=#d6d6d6
| 591758 ||  || — || February 28, 2014 || Haleakala || Pan-STARRS ||  || align=right | 2.0 km || 
|-id=759 bgcolor=#E9E9E9
| 591759 ||  || — || January 12, 2000 || Kitt Peak || Spacewatch ||  || align=right | 3.0 km || 
|-id=760 bgcolor=#C2FFFF
| 591760 ||  || — || May 20, 2004 || Kitt Peak || Spacewatch || L4 || align=right | 8.7 km || 
|-id=761 bgcolor=#C2FFFF
| 591761 ||  || — || January 19, 2013 || Kitt Peak || Spacewatch || L4 || align=right | 8.4 km || 
|-id=762 bgcolor=#C2FFFF
| 591762 ||  || — || November 12, 2010 || Mount Lemmon || Mount Lemmon Survey || L4 || align=right | 8.4 km || 
|-id=763 bgcolor=#E9E9E9
| 591763 Orishutʹ ||  ||  || February 27, 2014 || Mayhill-ISON || L. Elenin ||  || align=right | 1.6 km || 
|-id=764 bgcolor=#d6d6d6
| 591764 ||  || — || March 29, 2009 || Mount Lemmon || Mount Lemmon Survey ||  || align=right | 2.2 km || 
|-id=765 bgcolor=#C2FFFF
| 591765 ||  || — || February 20, 2002 || Kitt Peak || Spacewatch || L4 || align=right | 7.8 km || 
|-id=766 bgcolor=#d6d6d6
| 591766 ||  || — || May 7, 2010 || Mount Lemmon || Mount Lemmon Survey ||  || align=right | 2.2 km || 
|-id=767 bgcolor=#E9E9E9
| 591767 ||  || — || October 24, 2005 || Mauna Kea || Mauna Kea Obs. ||  || align=right | 1.4 km || 
|-id=768 bgcolor=#C2FFFF
| 591768 ||  || — || February 28, 2014 || Haleakala || Pan-STARRS || L4 || align=right | 7.4 km || 
|-id=769 bgcolor=#E9E9E9
| 591769 ||  || — || October 11, 2004 || Kitt Peak || Spacewatch ||  || align=right data-sort-value="0.80" | 800 m || 
|-id=770 bgcolor=#C2FFFF
| 591770 ||  || — || January 10, 2013 || Haleakala || Pan-STARRS || L4 || align=right | 6.7 km || 
|-id=771 bgcolor=#C2FFFF
| 591771 ||  || — || March 6, 2014 || Mount Lemmon || Mount Lemmon Survey || L4 || align=right | 8.0 km || 
|-id=772 bgcolor=#E9E9E9
| 591772 ||  || — || November 19, 2003 || Kitt Peak || Spacewatch ||  || align=right | 2.6 km || 
|-id=773 bgcolor=#d6d6d6
| 591773 ||  || — || January 6, 2013 || Mount Lemmon || Mount Lemmon Survey ||  || align=right | 2.5 km || 
|-id=774 bgcolor=#d6d6d6
| 591774 ||  || — || May 3, 2009 || Mount Lemmon || Mount Lemmon Survey ||  || align=right | 2.8 km || 
|-id=775 bgcolor=#d6d6d6
| 591775 ||  || — || February 11, 2014 || Mount Lemmon || Mount Lemmon Survey ||  || align=right | 2.8 km || 
|-id=776 bgcolor=#E9E9E9
| 591776 ||  || — || April 12, 2010 || Mount Lemmon || Mount Lemmon Survey ||  || align=right | 1.1 km || 
|-id=777 bgcolor=#d6d6d6
| 591777 ||  || — || February 26, 2014 || Mount Lemmon || Mount Lemmon Survey ||  || align=right | 2.5 km || 
|-id=778 bgcolor=#d6d6d6
| 591778 ||  || — || February 10, 2014 || Haleakala || Pan-STARRS ||  || align=right | 2.7 km || 
|-id=779 bgcolor=#C2FFFF
| 591779 ||  || — || March 20, 2015 || Haleakala || Pan-STARRS || L4 || align=right | 6.2 km || 
|-id=780 bgcolor=#C2FFFF
| 591780 ||  || — || September 6, 2008 || Kitt Peak || Spacewatch || L4 || align=right | 9.4 km || 
|-id=781 bgcolor=#C2FFFF
| 591781 ||  || — || February 28, 2014 || Haleakala || Pan-STARRS || L4 || align=right | 6.6 km || 
|-id=782 bgcolor=#C2FFFF
| 591782 ||  || — || October 14, 2010 || Mount Lemmon || Mount Lemmon Survey || L4 || align=right | 7.0 km || 
|-id=783 bgcolor=#C2FFFF
| 591783 ||  || — || September 5, 2008 || Kitt Peak || Spacewatch || L4 || align=right | 7.2 km || 
|-id=784 bgcolor=#d6d6d6
| 591784 ||  || — || October 9, 2007 || Kitt Peak || Spacewatch ||  || align=right | 2.0 km || 
|-id=785 bgcolor=#E9E9E9
| 591785 ||  || — || December 5, 2012 || Mount Lemmon || Mount Lemmon Survey ||  || align=right | 2.1 km || 
|-id=786 bgcolor=#E9E9E9
| 591786 ||  || — || October 20, 2007 || Kitt Peak || Spacewatch ||  || align=right | 2.1 km || 
|-id=787 bgcolor=#d6d6d6
| 591787 ||  || — || September 24, 2011 || Bergisch Gladbach || W. Bickel ||  || align=right | 2.5 km || 
|-id=788 bgcolor=#C2FFFF
| 591788 ||  || — || October 15, 2009 || Mount Lemmon || Mount Lemmon Survey || L4 || align=right | 6.6 km || 
|-id=789 bgcolor=#C2FFFF
| 591789 ||  || — || September 5, 2008 || Kitt Peak || Spacewatch || L4 || align=right | 8.2 km || 
|-id=790 bgcolor=#E9E9E9
| 591790 ||  || — || October 11, 2007 || Kitt Peak || Spacewatch ||  || align=right | 1.9 km || 
|-id=791 bgcolor=#E9E9E9
| 591791 ||  || — || January 5, 2013 || Mount Lemmon || Mount Lemmon Survey ||  || align=right | 1.9 km || 
|-id=792 bgcolor=#C2FFFF
| 591792 ||  || — || September 5, 2008 || Kitt Peak || Spacewatch || L4 || align=right | 8.6 km || 
|-id=793 bgcolor=#E9E9E9
| 591793 ||  || — || October 12, 2007 || Kitt Peak || Spacewatch ||  || align=right | 1.5 km || 
|-id=794 bgcolor=#E9E9E9
| 591794 ||  || — || October 10, 2007 || Kitt Peak || Spacewatch ||  || align=right | 1.8 km || 
|-id=795 bgcolor=#d6d6d6
| 591795 ||  || — || November 16, 2007 || Mount Lemmon || Mount Lemmon Survey ||  || align=right | 2.3 km || 
|-id=796 bgcolor=#d6d6d6
| 591796 ||  || — || October 28, 2017 || Haleakala || Pan-STARRS ||  || align=right | 1.9 km || 
|-id=797 bgcolor=#d6d6d6
| 591797 ||  || — || May 20, 2015 || Mount Lemmon || Mount Lemmon Survey ||  || align=right | 2.0 km || 
|-id=798 bgcolor=#E9E9E9
| 591798 ||  || — || December 1, 2008 || Mount Lemmon || Mount Lemmon Survey ||  || align=right | 2.5 km || 
|-id=799 bgcolor=#C2FFFF
| 591799 ||  || — || November 3, 2010 || Mount Lemmon || Mount Lemmon Survey || L4 || align=right | 6.4 km || 
|-id=800 bgcolor=#E9E9E9
| 591800 ||  || — || November 5, 2007 || Kitt Peak || Spacewatch ||  || align=right | 2.1 km || 
|}

591801–591900 

|-bgcolor=#d6d6d6
| 591801 ||  || — || May 21, 2015 || Haleakala || Pan-STARRS ||  || align=right | 1.9 km || 
|-id=802 bgcolor=#E9E9E9
| 591802 ||  || — || October 22, 2012 || Haleakala || Pan-STARRS ||  || align=right | 1.2 km || 
|-id=803 bgcolor=#E9E9E9
| 591803 ||  || — || December 22, 2008 || Catalina || CSS ||  || align=right | 2.6 km || 
|-id=804 bgcolor=#d6d6d6
| 591804 ||  || — || September 12, 2016 || Haleakala || Pan-STARRS ||  || align=right | 2.0 km || 
|-id=805 bgcolor=#C2FFFF
| 591805 ||  || — || December 12, 2012 || Mount Lemmon || Mount Lemmon Survey || L4 || align=right | 6.8 km || 
|-id=806 bgcolor=#E9E9E9
| 591806 ||  || — || October 5, 2016 || Mount Lemmon || Mount Lemmon Survey ||  || align=right | 2.5 km || 
|-id=807 bgcolor=#E9E9E9
| 591807 ||  || — || October 12, 2007 || Mount Lemmon || Mount Lemmon Survey ||  || align=right | 1.9 km || 
|-id=808 bgcolor=#E9E9E9
| 591808 ||  || — || October 20, 2012 || Piszkesteto || A. Király ||  || align=right | 2.1 km || 
|-id=809 bgcolor=#E9E9E9
| 591809 ||  || — || September 30, 2003 || Kitt Peak || Spacewatch ||  || align=right | 1.3 km || 
|-id=810 bgcolor=#d6d6d6
| 591810 ||  || — || October 19, 2011 || Mount Lemmon || Mount Lemmon Survey ||  || align=right | 1.6 km || 
|-id=811 bgcolor=#E9E9E9
| 591811 ||  || — || April 5, 2005 || Mount Lemmon || Mount Lemmon Survey ||  || align=right | 2.0 km || 
|-id=812 bgcolor=#C2FFFF
| 591812 ||  || — || July 29, 2008 || Kitt Peak || Spacewatch || L4 || align=right | 7.0 km || 
|-id=813 bgcolor=#d6d6d6
| 591813 ||  || — || September 17, 2006 || Kitt Peak || Spacewatch ||  || align=right | 2.5 km || 
|-id=814 bgcolor=#d6d6d6
| 591814 ||  || — || August 10, 2016 || Haleakala || Pan-STARRS ||  || align=right | 2.4 km || 
|-id=815 bgcolor=#fefefe
| 591815 ||  || — || October 14, 2001 || Apache Point || SDSS Collaboration ||  || align=right data-sort-value="0.67" | 670 m || 
|-id=816 bgcolor=#E9E9E9
| 591816 ||  || — || September 24, 2017 || Haleakala || Pan-STARRS ||  || align=right | 1.4 km || 
|-id=817 bgcolor=#C2FFFF
| 591817 ||  || — || October 11, 2010 || Mount Lemmon || Mount Lemmon Survey || L4 || align=right | 7.4 km || 
|-id=818 bgcolor=#d6d6d6
| 591818 ||  || — || February 20, 2009 || Kitt Peak || Spacewatch ||  || align=right | 2.0 km || 
|-id=819 bgcolor=#d6d6d6
| 591819 ||  || — || October 30, 2017 || Haleakala || Pan-STARRS ||  || align=right | 2.2 km || 
|-id=820 bgcolor=#d6d6d6
| 591820 ||  || — || October 29, 2016 || Mount Lemmon || Mount Lemmon Survey ||  || align=right | 2.0 km || 
|-id=821 bgcolor=#d6d6d6
| 591821 ||  || — || March 6, 2014 || Oukaimeden || C. Rinner ||  || align=right | 3.0 km || 
|-id=822 bgcolor=#d6d6d6
| 591822 ||  || — || April 7, 2003 || Kitt Peak || Spacewatch ||  || align=right | 2.3 km || 
|-id=823 bgcolor=#d6d6d6
| 591823 ||  || — || May 1, 2009 || Cerro Burek || Alianza S4 Obs. ||  || align=right | 2.5 km || 
|-id=824 bgcolor=#d6d6d6
| 591824 ||  || — || March 6, 2014 || Mount Lemmon || Mount Lemmon Survey ||  || align=right | 1.8 km || 
|-id=825 bgcolor=#E9E9E9
| 591825 ||  || — || October 18, 2012 || Haleakala || Pan-STARRS ||  || align=right data-sort-value="0.84" | 840 m || 
|-id=826 bgcolor=#C2FFFF
| 591826 ||  || — || October 22, 2011 || Mount Lemmon || Mount Lemmon Survey || L4 || align=right | 10 km || 
|-id=827 bgcolor=#C2FFFF
| 591827 ||  || — || November 6, 2010 || Mount Lemmon || Mount Lemmon Survey || L4 || align=right | 9.0 km || 
|-id=828 bgcolor=#C2FFFF
| 591828 ||  || — || June 8, 2005 || Kitt Peak || Spacewatch || L4 || align=right | 12 km || 
|-id=829 bgcolor=#E9E9E9
| 591829 ||  || — || September 26, 2012 || Mount Lemmon || Mount Lemmon Survey ||  || align=right | 2.1 km || 
|-id=830 bgcolor=#E9E9E9
| 591830 ||  || — || September 24, 2012 || Charleston || R. Holmes ||  || align=right | 1.5 km || 
|-id=831 bgcolor=#C2FFFF
| 591831 ||  || — || September 16, 2009 || Kitt Peak || Spacewatch || L4 || align=right | 7.6 km || 
|-id=832 bgcolor=#d6d6d6
| 591832 ||  || — || February 1, 2003 || Palomar || NEAT ||  || align=right | 3.5 km || 
|-id=833 bgcolor=#d6d6d6
| 591833 ||  || — || September 2, 2011 || Haleakala || Pan-STARRS ||  || align=right | 2.3 km || 
|-id=834 bgcolor=#d6d6d6
| 591834 ||  || — || March 6, 2014 || Mayhill-ISON || L. Elenin ||  || align=right | 2.5 km || 
|-id=835 bgcolor=#d6d6d6
| 591835 ||  || — || July 24, 2000 || Kitt Peak || Spacewatch ||  || align=right | 2.7 km || 
|-id=836 bgcolor=#d6d6d6
| 591836 ||  || — || November 4, 2007 || Mount Lemmon || Mount Lemmon Survey ||  || align=right | 2.4 km || 
|-id=837 bgcolor=#E9E9E9
| 591837 ||  || — || September 25, 2003 || Haleakala || AMOS ||  || align=right | 1.8 km || 
|-id=838 bgcolor=#C2FFFF
| 591838 ||  || — || December 27, 2011 || Mount Lemmon || Mount Lemmon Survey || L4 || align=right | 8.3 km || 
|-id=839 bgcolor=#C2FFFF
| 591839 ||  || — || March 11, 2014 || Mount Lemmon || Mount Lemmon Survey || L4 || align=right | 6.7 km || 
|-id=840 bgcolor=#d6d6d6
| 591840 ||  || — || December 23, 2012 || Haleakala || Pan-STARRS ||  || align=right | 2.5 km || 
|-id=841 bgcolor=#E9E9E9
| 591841 ||  || — || October 18, 2012 || Haleakala || Pan-STARRS ||  || align=right | 1.5 km || 
|-id=842 bgcolor=#d6d6d6
| 591842 ||  || — || January 24, 2014 || Haleakala || Pan-STARRS ||  || align=right | 2.2 km || 
|-id=843 bgcolor=#E9E9E9
| 591843 ||  || — || March 13, 2005 || Kitt Peak || Spacewatch ||  || align=right | 2.4 km || 
|-id=844 bgcolor=#d6d6d6
| 591844 ||  || — || March 25, 2014 || Haleakala || Pan-STARRS ||  || align=right | 2.0 km || 
|-id=845 bgcolor=#d6d6d6
| 591845 ||  || — || February 22, 2003 || Palomar || NEAT ||  || align=right | 3.0 km || 
|-id=846 bgcolor=#d6d6d6
| 591846 ||  || — || March 24, 2014 || Haleakala || Pan-STARRS ||  || align=right | 2.3 km || 
|-id=847 bgcolor=#d6d6d6
| 591847 ||  || — || March 29, 2014 || Mount Lemmon || Mount Lemmon Survey ||  || align=right | 2.8 km || 
|-id=848 bgcolor=#d6d6d6
| 591848 ||  || — || March 24, 2014 || Haleakala || Pan-STARRS ||  || align=right | 2.5 km || 
|-id=849 bgcolor=#d6d6d6
| 591849 ||  || — || November 12, 2012 || Mount Lemmon || Mount Lemmon Survey ||  || align=right | 1.7 km || 
|-id=850 bgcolor=#C2FFFF
| 591850 ||  || — || September 6, 2008 || Kitt Peak || Spacewatch || L4 || align=right | 9.0 km || 
|-id=851 bgcolor=#fefefe
| 591851 ||  || — || March 14, 2011 || Mount Lemmon || Mount Lemmon Survey ||  || align=right data-sort-value="0.67" | 670 m || 
|-id=852 bgcolor=#d6d6d6
| 591852 ||  || — || February 26, 2014 || Haleakala || Pan-STARRS ||  || align=right | 2.7 km || 
|-id=853 bgcolor=#C2FFFF
| 591853 ||  || — || July 30, 2008 || Kitt Peak || Spacewatch || L4 || align=right | 10 km || 
|-id=854 bgcolor=#fefefe
| 591854 ||  || — || February 9, 2010 || Mount Lemmon || Mount Lemmon Survey || MAS || align=right data-sort-value="0.67" | 670 m || 
|-id=855 bgcolor=#C2FFFF
| 591855 ||  || — || September 24, 2008 || Kitt Peak || Spacewatch || L4 || align=right | 9.1 km || 
|-id=856 bgcolor=#d6d6d6
| 591856 ||  || — || February 7, 2008 || Kitt Peak || Spacewatch ||  || align=right | 2.1 km || 
|-id=857 bgcolor=#d6d6d6
| 591857 ||  || — || April 2, 2014 || Kitt Peak || Spacewatch ||  || align=right | 2.0 km || 
|-id=858 bgcolor=#d6d6d6
| 591858 ||  || — || September 1, 2005 || Kitt Peak || Spacewatch ||  || align=right | 2.2 km || 
|-id=859 bgcolor=#d6d6d6
| 591859 ||  || — || September 16, 2010 || Catalina || CSS ||  || align=right | 3.1 km || 
|-id=860 bgcolor=#d6d6d6
| 591860 ||  || — || February 28, 2014 || Haleakala || Pan-STARRS ||  || align=right | 1.9 km || 
|-id=861 bgcolor=#d6d6d6
| 591861 ||  || — || January 6, 2008 || Zelenchukskaya Stn || Zelenchukskaya Stn. ||  || align=right | 2.5 km || 
|-id=862 bgcolor=#d6d6d6
| 591862 ||  || — || April 4, 2014 || Mount Lemmon || Mount Lemmon Survey ||  || align=right | 2.1 km || 
|-id=863 bgcolor=#E9E9E9
| 591863 ||  || — || September 20, 2011 || Mount Lemmon || Mount Lemmon Survey ||  || align=right | 2.1 km || 
|-id=864 bgcolor=#E9E9E9
| 591864 ||  || — || October 14, 2007 || Mount Lemmon || Mount Lemmon Survey ||  || align=right | 2.2 km || 
|-id=865 bgcolor=#d6d6d6
| 591865 ||  || — || October 19, 2011 || Kitt Peak || Spacewatch ||  || align=right | 2.4 km || 
|-id=866 bgcolor=#d6d6d6
| 591866 ||  || — || February 25, 2014 || Haleakala || Pan-STARRS ||  || align=right | 2.5 km || 
|-id=867 bgcolor=#fefefe
| 591867 ||  || — || August 29, 2005 || Kitt Peak || Spacewatch ||  || align=right data-sort-value="0.51" | 510 m || 
|-id=868 bgcolor=#E9E9E9
| 591868 ||  || — || December 3, 2004 || Kitt Peak || Spacewatch ||  || align=right | 1.1 km || 
|-id=869 bgcolor=#E9E9E9
| 591869 ||  || — || September 11, 2007 || Kitt Peak || Spacewatch ||  || align=right | 1.4 km || 
|-id=870 bgcolor=#d6d6d6
| 591870 ||  || — || February 1, 2013 || Kitt Peak || Spacewatch ||  || align=right | 2.9 km || 
|-id=871 bgcolor=#d6d6d6
| 591871 ||  || — || September 13, 2005 || Kitt Peak || Spacewatch ||  || align=right | 2.3 km || 
|-id=872 bgcolor=#d6d6d6
| 591872 ||  || — || November 26, 2011 || Mount Lemmon || Mount Lemmon Survey ||  || align=right | 3.2 km || 
|-id=873 bgcolor=#E9E9E9
| 591873 ||  || — || January 29, 2014 || Kitt Peak || Spacewatch ||  || align=right | 1.3 km || 
|-id=874 bgcolor=#fefefe
| 591874 ||  || — || May 21, 2011 || Haleakala || Pan-STARRS ||  || align=right data-sort-value="0.53" | 530 m || 
|-id=875 bgcolor=#d6d6d6
| 591875 ||  || — || September 4, 2004 || Siding Spring || SSS || TIR || align=right | 4.8 km || 
|-id=876 bgcolor=#E9E9E9
| 591876 ||  || — || March 27, 2014 || Haleakala || Pan-STARRS ||  || align=right | 2.5 km || 
|-id=877 bgcolor=#d6d6d6
| 591877 ||  || — || April 5, 2014 || Haleakala || Pan-STARRS ||  || align=right | 2.7 km || 
|-id=878 bgcolor=#C2FFFF
| 591878 ||  || — || September 6, 2008 || Kitt Peak || Spacewatch || L4 || align=right | 6.0 km || 
|-id=879 bgcolor=#d6d6d6
| 591879 ||  || — || March 13, 2003 || Kitt Peak || Spacewatch ||  || align=right | 2.6 km || 
|-id=880 bgcolor=#d6d6d6
| 591880 ||  || — || February 1, 2013 || Kitt Peak || Spacewatch ||  || align=right | 3.0 km || 
|-id=881 bgcolor=#E9E9E9
| 591881 ||  || — || February 12, 2000 || Apache Point || SDSS Collaboration ||  || align=right | 1.9 km || 
|-id=882 bgcolor=#d6d6d6
| 591882 ||  || — || August 13, 2004 || Cerro Tololo || Cerro Tololo Obs. ||  || align=right | 2.6 km || 
|-id=883 bgcolor=#fefefe
| 591883 ||  || — || April 10, 2014 || Haleakala || Pan-STARRS ||  || align=right data-sort-value="0.80" | 800 m || 
|-id=884 bgcolor=#d6d6d6
| 591884 ||  || — || July 16, 2004 || Siding Spring || SSS ||  || align=right | 3.4 km || 
|-id=885 bgcolor=#d6d6d6
| 591885 ||  || — || September 25, 2016 || Haleakala || Pan-STARRS ||  || align=right | 2.8 km || 
|-id=886 bgcolor=#fefefe
| 591886 ||  || — || April 5, 2014 || Haleakala || Pan-STARRS ||  || align=right data-sort-value="0.49" | 490 m || 
|-id=887 bgcolor=#d6d6d6
| 591887 ||  || — || April 5, 2014 || Haleakala || Pan-STARRS ||  || align=right | 2.5 km || 
|-id=888 bgcolor=#d6d6d6
| 591888 ||  || — || April 5, 2014 || Haleakala || Pan-STARRS ||  || align=right | 2.1 km || 
|-id=889 bgcolor=#d6d6d6
| 591889 ||  || — || April 5, 2014 || Haleakala || Pan-STARRS ||  || align=right | 1.9 km || 
|-id=890 bgcolor=#d6d6d6
| 591890 ||  || — || April 2, 2014 || Mount Lemmon || Mount Lemmon Survey ||  || align=right | 2.3 km || 
|-id=891 bgcolor=#d6d6d6
| 591891 ||  || — || April 4, 2014 || Mayhill-ISON || L. Elenin ||  || align=right | 2.4 km || 
|-id=892 bgcolor=#d6d6d6
| 591892 ||  || — || April 1, 2014 || Mount Lemmon || Mount Lemmon Survey ||  || align=right | 2.7 km || 
|-id=893 bgcolor=#d6d6d6
| 591893 ||  || — || April 5, 2014 || Haleakala || Pan-STARRS ||  || align=right | 2.3 km || 
|-id=894 bgcolor=#E9E9E9
| 591894 ||  || — || April 1, 2014 || Mount Lemmon || Mount Lemmon Survey ||  || align=right | 1.5 km || 
|-id=895 bgcolor=#fefefe
| 591895 ||  || — || January 6, 2010 || Kitt Peak || Spacewatch ||  || align=right data-sort-value="0.57" | 570 m || 
|-id=896 bgcolor=#d6d6d6
| 591896 ||  || — || October 31, 2010 || Mount Lemmon || Mount Lemmon Survey ||  || align=right | 2.2 km || 
|-id=897 bgcolor=#d6d6d6
| 591897 ||  || — || January 11, 2008 || Kitt Peak || Spacewatch ||  || align=right | 1.8 km || 
|-id=898 bgcolor=#d6d6d6
| 591898 ||  || — || March 26, 2009 || Kitt Peak || Spacewatch ||  || align=right | 2.5 km || 
|-id=899 bgcolor=#d6d6d6
| 591899 ||  || — || September 23, 2005 || Kitt Peak || Spacewatch ||  || align=right | 2.9 km || 
|-id=900 bgcolor=#d6d6d6
| 591900 ||  || — || December 12, 2012 || Kitt Peak || Spacewatch ||  || align=right | 2.0 km || 
|}

591901–592000 

|-bgcolor=#d6d6d6
| 591901 ||  || — || April 24, 2014 || Mount Lemmon || Mount Lemmon Survey ||  || align=right | 1.9 km || 
|-id=902 bgcolor=#d6d6d6
| 591902 ||  || — || April 24, 2014 || Mount Lemmon || Mount Lemmon Survey ||  || align=right | 2.0 km || 
|-id=903 bgcolor=#E9E9E9
| 591903 ||  || — || May 21, 2006 || Kitt Peak || Spacewatch ||  || align=right data-sort-value="0.70" | 700 m || 
|-id=904 bgcolor=#d6d6d6
| 591904 ||  || — || April 25, 2003 || Kitt Peak || Spacewatch || EOS || align=right | 1.6 km || 
|-id=905 bgcolor=#d6d6d6
| 591905 ||  || — || August 12, 2004 || Cerro Tololo || Cerro Tololo Obs. ||  || align=right | 2.4 km || 
|-id=906 bgcolor=#d6d6d6
| 591906 ||  || — || April 22, 2009 || Mount Lemmon || Mount Lemmon Survey ||  || align=right | 1.8 km || 
|-id=907 bgcolor=#d6d6d6
| 591907 ||  || — || April 23, 2014 || Cerro Tololo-DECam || CTIO-DECam ||  || align=right | 1.7 km || 
|-id=908 bgcolor=#d6d6d6
| 591908 ||  || — || February 28, 2008 || Mount Lemmon || Mount Lemmon Survey ||  || align=right | 2.0 km || 
|-id=909 bgcolor=#d6d6d6
| 591909 ||  || — || April 23, 2014 || Cerro Tololo-DECam || CTIO-DECam ||  || align=right | 2.0 km || 
|-id=910 bgcolor=#d6d6d6
| 591910 ||  || — || December 23, 2012 || Haleakala || Pan-STARRS ||  || align=right | 1.8 km || 
|-id=911 bgcolor=#d6d6d6
| 591911 ||  || — || October 26, 2011 || Haleakala || Pan-STARRS ||  || align=right | 2.3 km || 
|-id=912 bgcolor=#d6d6d6
| 591912 ||  || — || October 14, 2010 || Kitt Peak || Spacewatch ||  || align=right | 2.4 km || 
|-id=913 bgcolor=#d6d6d6
| 591913 ||  || — || November 15, 2011 || Mount Lemmon || Mount Lemmon Survey ||  || align=right | 2.2 km || 
|-id=914 bgcolor=#E9E9E9
| 591914 ||  || — || April 23, 2014 || Cerro Tololo-DECam || CTIO-DECam ||  || align=right | 1.2 km || 
|-id=915 bgcolor=#d6d6d6
| 591915 ||  || — || April 24, 2014 || Mount Lemmon || Mount Lemmon Survey ||  || align=right | 2.1 km || 
|-id=916 bgcolor=#d6d6d6
| 591916 ||  || — || March 11, 2003 || Kitt Peak || Spacewatch ||  || align=right | 2.1 km || 
|-id=917 bgcolor=#d6d6d6
| 591917 ||  || — || March 30, 2003 || Kitt Peak || M. W. Buie, A. B. Jordan ||  || align=right | 2.4 km || 
|-id=918 bgcolor=#d6d6d6
| 591918 ||  || — || April 23, 2014 || Cerro Tololo-DECam || CTIO-DECam ||  || align=right | 2.6 km || 
|-id=919 bgcolor=#fefefe
| 591919 ||  || — || March 29, 2014 || Kitt Peak || Spacewatch ||  || align=right data-sort-value="0.55" | 550 m || 
|-id=920 bgcolor=#d6d6d6
| 591920 ||  || — || September 30, 2006 || Mount Lemmon || Mount Lemmon Survey ||  || align=right | 3.0 km || 
|-id=921 bgcolor=#d6d6d6
| 591921 ||  || — || July 16, 2004 || Cerro Tololo || Cerro Tololo Obs. ||  || align=right | 2.7 km || 
|-id=922 bgcolor=#fefefe
| 591922 ||  || — || November 21, 2009 || Kitt Peak || Spacewatch ||  || align=right data-sort-value="0.49" | 490 m || 
|-id=923 bgcolor=#E9E9E9
| 591923 ||  || — || September 23, 2011 || Haleakala || Pan-STARRS ||  || align=right | 1.1 km || 
|-id=924 bgcolor=#d6d6d6
| 591924 ||  || — || April 7, 2003 || Kitt Peak || Spacewatch ||  || align=right | 2.7 km || 
|-id=925 bgcolor=#E9E9E9
| 591925 ||  || — || September 26, 2011 || Haleakala || Pan-STARRS ||  || align=right | 1.7 km || 
|-id=926 bgcolor=#fefefe
| 591926 ||  || — || April 5, 2014 || Haleakala || Pan-STARRS ||  || align=right data-sort-value="0.47" | 470 m || 
|-id=927 bgcolor=#d6d6d6
| 591927 ||  || — || March 12, 2008 || Kitt Peak || Spacewatch ||  || align=right | 2.2 km || 
|-id=928 bgcolor=#d6d6d6
| 591928 ||  || — || July 30, 2005 || Palomar || NEAT ||  || align=right | 3.1 km || 
|-id=929 bgcolor=#d6d6d6
| 591929 ||  || — || March 31, 2003 || Cerro Tololo || Cerro Tololo Obs. ||  || align=right | 2.5 km || 
|-id=930 bgcolor=#E9E9E9
| 591930 ||  || — || April 24, 2014 || Mount Lemmon || Mount Lemmon Survey ||  || align=right | 1.9 km || 
|-id=931 bgcolor=#d6d6d6
| 591931 ||  || — || March 28, 2014 || Mount Lemmon || Mount Lemmon Survey ||  || align=right | 3.3 km || 
|-id=932 bgcolor=#d6d6d6
| 591932 ||  || — || April 24, 2014 || Mount Lemmon || Mount Lemmon Survey ||  || align=right | 2.4 km || 
|-id=933 bgcolor=#E9E9E9
| 591933 ||  || — || February 12, 2000 || Apache Point || SDSS Collaboration || DOR || align=right | 2.3 km || 
|-id=934 bgcolor=#fefefe
| 591934 ||  || — || September 24, 2012 || Kitt Peak || Spacewatch ||  || align=right data-sort-value="0.45" | 450 m || 
|-id=935 bgcolor=#d6d6d6
| 591935 ||  || — || April 1, 2003 || Apache Point || SDSS Collaboration ||  || align=right | 2.2 km || 
|-id=936 bgcolor=#d6d6d6
| 591936 ||  || — || December 22, 2012 || Haleakala || Pan-STARRS ||  || align=right | 2.3 km || 
|-id=937 bgcolor=#d6d6d6
| 591937 ||  || — || April 5, 2014 || Haleakala || Pan-STARRS || LIX || align=right | 3.7 km || 
|-id=938 bgcolor=#d6d6d6
| 591938 ||  || — || December 12, 2012 || Mount Lemmon || Mount Lemmon Survey ||  || align=right | 2.3 km || 
|-id=939 bgcolor=#d6d6d6
| 591939 ||  || — || November 12, 2006 || Mount Lemmon || Mount Lemmon Survey ||  || align=right | 2.7 km || 
|-id=940 bgcolor=#d6d6d6
| 591940 ||  || — || October 26, 2011 || Haleakala || Pan-STARRS ||  || align=right | 2.4 km || 
|-id=941 bgcolor=#d6d6d6
| 591941 ||  || — || October 3, 2005 || Catalina || CSS ||  || align=right | 3.2 km || 
|-id=942 bgcolor=#d6d6d6
| 591942 ||  || — || October 21, 2006 || Lulin || LUSS || HYG || align=right | 2.5 km || 
|-id=943 bgcolor=#d6d6d6
| 591943 ||  || — || April 30, 2014 || Haleakala || Pan-STARRS ||  || align=right | 2.5 km || 
|-id=944 bgcolor=#d6d6d6
| 591944 ||  || — || April 30, 2014 || Haleakala || Pan-STARRS ||  || align=right | 2.1 km || 
|-id=945 bgcolor=#d6d6d6
| 591945 ||  || — || April 30, 2014 || Haleakala || Pan-STARRS ||  || align=right | 2.4 km || 
|-id=946 bgcolor=#d6d6d6
| 591946 ||  || — || April 29, 2014 || Haleakala || Pan-STARRS ||  || align=right | 2.1 km || 
|-id=947 bgcolor=#d6d6d6
| 591947 ||  || — || April 29, 2014 || Haleakala || Pan-STARRS ||  || align=right | 1.9 km || 
|-id=948 bgcolor=#d6d6d6
| 591948 ||  || — || April 24, 2014 || Mount Lemmon || Mount Lemmon Survey ||  || align=right | 2.2 km || 
|-id=949 bgcolor=#d6d6d6
| 591949 ||  || — || May 3, 2014 || Mount Lemmon || Mount Lemmon Survey ||  || align=right | 2.2 km || 
|-id=950 bgcolor=#d6d6d6
| 591950 ||  || — || September 7, 2005 || Uccle || T. Pauwels || EOS || align=right | 1.7 km || 
|-id=951 bgcolor=#E9E9E9
| 591951 ||  || — || February 1, 2009 || Kitt Peak || Spacewatch ||  || align=right data-sort-value="0.75" | 750 m || 
|-id=952 bgcolor=#d6d6d6
| 591952 ||  || — || March 1, 2009 || Mount Lemmon || Mount Lemmon Survey ||  || align=right | 2.6 km || 
|-id=953 bgcolor=#d6d6d6
| 591953 ||  || — || May 2, 2003 || Kitt Peak || Spacewatch ||  || align=right | 2.6 km || 
|-id=954 bgcolor=#d6d6d6
| 591954 ||  || — || April 7, 2014 || Kitt Peak || Spacewatch ||  || align=right | 2.3 km || 
|-id=955 bgcolor=#d6d6d6
| 591955 ||  || — || May 5, 2003 || Kitt Peak || Spacewatch ||  || align=right | 2.7 km || 
|-id=956 bgcolor=#d6d6d6
| 591956 ||  || — || September 11, 2004 || Palomar || NEAT ||  || align=right | 3.3 km || 
|-id=957 bgcolor=#E9E9E9
| 591957 ||  || — || May 2, 2006 || Mount Lemmon || Mount Lemmon Survey ||  || align=right data-sort-value="0.80" | 800 m || 
|-id=958 bgcolor=#d6d6d6
| 591958 ||  || — || March 26, 2008 || Mount Lemmon || Mount Lemmon Survey ||  || align=right | 2.2 km || 
|-id=959 bgcolor=#d6d6d6
| 591959 ||  || — || April 29, 2014 || ESA OGS || ESA OGS ||  || align=right | 2.7 km || 
|-id=960 bgcolor=#d6d6d6
| 591960 ||  || — || April 30, 2014 || Haleakala || Pan-STARRS ||  || align=right | 2.7 km || 
|-id=961 bgcolor=#d6d6d6
| 591961 ||  || — || August 30, 2005 || Palomar || NEAT ||  || align=right | 3.3 km || 
|-id=962 bgcolor=#d6d6d6
| 591962 ||  || — || September 4, 2010 || Kitt Peak || Spacewatch ||  || align=right | 2.4 km || 
|-id=963 bgcolor=#d6d6d6
| 591963 ||  || — || October 31, 2006 || Mount Lemmon || Mount Lemmon Survey || EOS || align=right | 1.8 km || 
|-id=964 bgcolor=#d6d6d6
| 591964 Jakucs ||  ||  || September 7, 2010 || Piszkesteto || Z. Kuli ||  || align=right | 2.6 km || 
|-id=965 bgcolor=#d6d6d6
| 591965 ||  || — || November 10, 2005 || Piszkesteto || K. Sárneczky ||  || align=right | 3.8 km || 
|-id=966 bgcolor=#d6d6d6
| 591966 ||  || — || August 10, 2004 || Siding Spring || SSS ||  || align=right | 3.3 km || 
|-id=967 bgcolor=#d6d6d6
| 591967 ||  || — || May 28, 2014 || Mount Lemmon || Mount Lemmon Survey ||  || align=right | 2.5 km || 
|-id=968 bgcolor=#d6d6d6
| 591968 ||  || — || May 7, 2014 || Haleakala || Pan-STARRS ||  || align=right | 2.7 km || 
|-id=969 bgcolor=#d6d6d6
| 591969 ||  || — || May 6, 2014 || Haleakala || Pan-STARRS ||  || align=right | 3.1 km || 
|-id=970 bgcolor=#d6d6d6
| 591970 ||  || — || May 7, 2014 || Haleakala || Pan-STARRS ||  || align=right | 2.4 km || 
|-id=971 bgcolor=#d6d6d6
| 591971 ||  || — || May 3, 2014 || Haleakala || Pan-STARRS ||  || align=right | 2.6 km || 
|-id=972 bgcolor=#d6d6d6
| 591972 ||  || — || May 2, 2014 || Mount Lemmon || Mount Lemmon Survey ||  || align=right | 1.9 km || 
|-id=973 bgcolor=#E9E9E9
| 591973 ||  || — || May 4, 2014 || Mount Lemmon || Mount Lemmon Survey ||  || align=right | 1.9 km || 
|-id=974 bgcolor=#d6d6d6
| 591974 ||  || — || May 6, 2014 || Haleakala || Pan-STARRS ||  || align=right | 3.3 km || 
|-id=975 bgcolor=#d6d6d6
| 591975 ||  || — || May 6, 2014 || Haleakala || Pan-STARRS ||  || align=right | 2.1 km || 
|-id=976 bgcolor=#d6d6d6
| 591976 ||  || — || May 7, 2014 || Haleakala || Pan-STARRS ||  || align=right | 2.1 km || 
|-id=977 bgcolor=#d6d6d6
| 591977 ||  || — || March 28, 2014 || Kitt Peak || Spacewatch ||  || align=right | 2.3 km || 
|-id=978 bgcolor=#E9E9E9
| 591978 ||  || — || April 5, 2014 || Haleakala || Pan-STARRS ||  || align=right data-sort-value="0.68" | 680 m || 
|-id=979 bgcolor=#E9E9E9
| 591979 ||  || — || December 5, 2007 || Kitt Peak || Spacewatch ||  || align=right | 1.9 km || 
|-id=980 bgcolor=#d6d6d6
| 591980 ||  || — || January 13, 2008 || Kitt Peak || Spacewatch ||  || align=right | 2.0 km || 
|-id=981 bgcolor=#d6d6d6
| 591981 ||  || — || November 16, 2011 || Kitt Peak || Spacewatch ||  || align=right | 2.5 km || 
|-id=982 bgcolor=#d6d6d6
| 591982 ||  || — || April 24, 2014 || Haleakala || Pan-STARRS ||  || align=right | 3.2 km || 
|-id=983 bgcolor=#d6d6d6
| 591983 ||  || — || May 3, 2014 || Mount Lemmon || Mount Lemmon Survey || Tj (2.99) || align=right | 3.0 km || 
|-id=984 bgcolor=#d6d6d6
| 591984 ||  || — || February 9, 2014 || Haleakala || Pan-STARRS ||  || align=right | 1.9 km || 
|-id=985 bgcolor=#d6d6d6
| 591985 ||  || — || May 22, 2014 || Haleakala || Pan-STARRS ||  || align=right | 2.6 km || 
|-id=986 bgcolor=#C2FFFF
| 591986 ||  || — || September 26, 2008 || Mount Lemmon || Mount Lemmon Survey || L4 || align=right | 11 km || 
|-id=987 bgcolor=#d6d6d6
| 591987 ||  || — || April 24, 2014 || Kitt Peak || Spacewatch ||  || align=right | 2.5 km || 
|-id=988 bgcolor=#d6d6d6
| 591988 ||  || — || February 9, 2013 || Haleakala || Pan-STARRS ||  || align=right | 2.4 km || 
|-id=989 bgcolor=#d6d6d6
| 591989 ||  || — || April 24, 2014 || Haleakala || Pan-STARRS ||  || align=right | 3.1 km || 
|-id=990 bgcolor=#d6d6d6
| 591990 ||  || — || April 5, 2014 || Haleakala || Pan-STARRS ||  || align=right | 2.4 km || 
|-id=991 bgcolor=#d6d6d6
| 591991 ||  || — || October 12, 2006 || Kitt Peak || Spacewatch ||  || align=right | 2.1 km || 
|-id=992 bgcolor=#d6d6d6
| 591992 ||  || — || May 9, 2014 || Haleakala || Pan-STARRS ||  || align=right | 2.0 km || 
|-id=993 bgcolor=#d6d6d6
| 591993 ||  || — || November 10, 2004 || Kitt Peak || M. W. Buie, L. H. Wasserman ||  || align=right | 1.9 km || 
|-id=994 bgcolor=#d6d6d6
| 591994 ||  || — || October 12, 2010 || Vail-Jarnac || T. Glinos ||  || align=right | 3.3 km || 
|-id=995 bgcolor=#d6d6d6
| 591995 ||  || — || May 24, 2014 || Haleakala || Pan-STARRS ||  || align=right | 2.4 km || 
|-id=996 bgcolor=#d6d6d6
| 591996 ||  || — || October 4, 2005 || Palomar || NEAT ||  || align=right | 3.5 km || 
|-id=997 bgcolor=#d6d6d6
| 591997 ||  || — || September 16, 2010 || Mount Lemmon || Mount Lemmon Survey ||  || align=right | 2.5 km || 
|-id=998 bgcolor=#d6d6d6
| 591998 ||  || — || November 21, 2006 || Mount Lemmon || Mount Lemmon Survey ||  || align=right | 2.7 km || 
|-id=999 bgcolor=#d6d6d6
| 591999 ||  || — || May 7, 2014 || Haleakala || Pan-STARRS ||  || align=right | 2.5 km || 
|-id=000 bgcolor=#d6d6d6
| 592000 ||  || — || January 18, 2012 || Mount Lemmon || Mount Lemmon Survey ||  || align=right | 2.1 km || 
|}

References

External links 
 Discovery Circumstances: Numbered Minor Planets (590001)–(595000) (IAU Minor Planet Center)

0591